

59001–59100 

|-bgcolor=#E9E9E9
| 59001 Senftenberg ||  ||  || September 26, 1998 || Kleť || J. Tichá, M. Tichý || RAF || align=right | 2.7 km || 
|-id=002 bgcolor=#fefefe
| 59002 ||  || — || September 21, 1998 || Kitt Peak || Spacewatch || — || align=right | 2.4 km || 
|-id=003 bgcolor=#fefefe
| 59003 ||  || — || September 23, 1998 || Xinglong || SCAP || NYS || align=right | 1.1 km || 
|-id=004 bgcolor=#d6d6d6
| 59004 ||  || — || September 25, 1998 || Xinglong || SCAP || THM || align=right | 6.1 km || 
|-id=005 bgcolor=#E9E9E9
| 59005 ||  || — || September 16, 1998 || Anderson Mesa || LONEOS || — || align=right | 2.6 km || 
|-id=006 bgcolor=#E9E9E9
| 59006 ||  || — || September 17, 1998 || Anderson Mesa || LONEOS || — || align=right | 1.7 km || 
|-id=007 bgcolor=#fefefe
| 59007 ||  || — || September 26, 1998 || Xinglong || SCAP || NYS || align=right | 4.9 km || 
|-id=008 bgcolor=#E9E9E9
| 59008 ||  || — || September 30, 1998 || Xinglong || SCAP || — || align=right | 4.3 km || 
|-id=009 bgcolor=#fefefe
| 59009 ||  || — || September 20, 1998 || La Silla || E. W. Elst || V || align=right | 1.9 km || 
|-id=010 bgcolor=#E9E9E9
| 59010 ||  || — || September 19, 1998 || Socorro || LINEAR || RAF || align=right | 2.3 km || 
|-id=011 bgcolor=#fefefe
| 59011 ||  || — || September 21, 1998 || La Silla || E. W. Elst || — || align=right | 1.5 km || 
|-id=012 bgcolor=#d6d6d6
| 59012 ||  || — || September 21, 1998 || La Silla || E. W. Elst || — || align=right | 8.2 km || 
|-id=013 bgcolor=#E9E9E9
| 59013 ||  || — || September 21, 1998 || La Silla || E. W. Elst || — || align=right | 3.5 km || 
|-id=014 bgcolor=#fefefe
| 59014 ||  || — || September 21, 1998 || La Silla || E. W. Elst || NYS || align=right | 1.3 km || 
|-id=015 bgcolor=#E9E9E9
| 59015 ||  || — || September 21, 1998 || La Silla || E. W. Elst || — || align=right | 2.4 km || 
|-id=016 bgcolor=#E9E9E9
| 59016 ||  || — || September 26, 1998 || Socorro || LINEAR || — || align=right | 2.2 km || 
|-id=017 bgcolor=#fefefe
| 59017 ||  || — || September 26, 1998 || Socorro || LINEAR || NYS || align=right | 1.6 km || 
|-id=018 bgcolor=#fefefe
| 59018 ||  || — || September 26, 1998 || Socorro || LINEAR || ERI || align=right | 3.6 km || 
|-id=019 bgcolor=#E9E9E9
| 59019 ||  || — || September 26, 1998 || Socorro || LINEAR || — || align=right | 4.8 km || 
|-id=020 bgcolor=#E9E9E9
| 59020 ||  || — || September 26, 1998 || Socorro || LINEAR || — || align=right | 4.6 km || 
|-id=021 bgcolor=#fefefe
| 59021 ||  || — || September 26, 1998 || Socorro || LINEAR || NYS || align=right | 1.2 km || 
|-id=022 bgcolor=#fefefe
| 59022 ||  || — || September 26, 1998 || Socorro || LINEAR || — || align=right | 1.9 km || 
|-id=023 bgcolor=#fefefe
| 59023 ||  || — || September 26, 1998 || Socorro || LINEAR || — || align=right | 4.2 km || 
|-id=024 bgcolor=#fefefe
| 59024 ||  || — || September 26, 1998 || Socorro || LINEAR || — || align=right | 1.6 km || 
|-id=025 bgcolor=#fefefe
| 59025 ||  || — || September 26, 1998 || Socorro || LINEAR || — || align=right | 1.6 km || 
|-id=026 bgcolor=#fefefe
| 59026 ||  || — || September 26, 1998 || Socorro || LINEAR || NYS || align=right | 1.3 km || 
|-id=027 bgcolor=#E9E9E9
| 59027 ||  || — || September 26, 1998 || Socorro || LINEAR || — || align=right | 2.0 km || 
|-id=028 bgcolor=#fefefe
| 59028 ||  || — || September 26, 1998 || Socorro || LINEAR || — || align=right | 2.8 km || 
|-id=029 bgcolor=#E9E9E9
| 59029 ||  || — || September 26, 1998 || Socorro || LINEAR || — || align=right | 2.5 km || 
|-id=030 bgcolor=#fefefe
| 59030 ||  || — || September 26, 1998 || Socorro || LINEAR || — || align=right | 2.1 km || 
|-id=031 bgcolor=#fefefe
| 59031 ||  || — || September 26, 1998 || Socorro || LINEAR || — || align=right | 1.6 km || 
|-id=032 bgcolor=#fefefe
| 59032 ||  || — || September 26, 1998 || Socorro || LINEAR || V || align=right | 1.4 km || 
|-id=033 bgcolor=#fefefe
| 59033 ||  || — || September 26, 1998 || Socorro || LINEAR || NYS || align=right | 1.3 km || 
|-id=034 bgcolor=#E9E9E9
| 59034 ||  || — || September 26, 1998 || Socorro || LINEAR || HEN || align=right | 2.2 km || 
|-id=035 bgcolor=#fefefe
| 59035 ||  || — || September 26, 1998 || Socorro || LINEAR || NYS || align=right | 4.2 km || 
|-id=036 bgcolor=#d6d6d6
| 59036 ||  || — || September 26, 1998 || Socorro || LINEAR || — || align=right | 7.5 km || 
|-id=037 bgcolor=#fefefe
| 59037 ||  || — || September 26, 1998 || Socorro || LINEAR || — || align=right | 2.1 km || 
|-id=038 bgcolor=#fefefe
| 59038 ||  || — || September 20, 1998 || La Silla || E. W. Elst || — || align=right | 1.9 km || 
|-id=039 bgcolor=#fefefe
| 59039 ||  || — || September 26, 1998 || Socorro || LINEAR || — || align=right | 1.4 km || 
|-id=040 bgcolor=#E9E9E9
| 59040 ||  || — || September 26, 1998 || Socorro || LINEAR || — || align=right | 3.2 km || 
|-id=041 bgcolor=#fefefe
| 59041 ||  || — || September 26, 1998 || Socorro || LINEAR || NYS || align=right | 2.1 km || 
|-id=042 bgcolor=#E9E9E9
| 59042 ||  || — || September 26, 1998 || Socorro || LINEAR || — || align=right | 1.7 km || 
|-id=043 bgcolor=#E9E9E9
| 59043 ||  || — || September 27, 1998 || Anderson Mesa || LONEOS || — || align=right | 2.3 km || 
|-id=044 bgcolor=#E9E9E9
| 59044 ||  || — || September 18, 1998 || Anderson Mesa || LONEOS || — || align=right | 4.2 km || 
|-id=045 bgcolor=#E9E9E9
| 59045 ||  || — || October 13, 1998 || Caussols || ODAS || — || align=right | 2.3 km || 
|-id=046 bgcolor=#fefefe
| 59046 ||  || — || October 13, 1998 || Višnjan Observatory || K. Korlević || MAS || align=right | 2.1 km || 
|-id=047 bgcolor=#fefefe
| 59047 ||  || — || October 15, 1998 || Xinglong || SCAP || — || align=right | 2.1 km || 
|-id=048 bgcolor=#fefefe
| 59048 ||  || — || October 13, 1998 || Kitt Peak || Spacewatch || MAS || align=right | 1.5 km || 
|-id=049 bgcolor=#C2FFFF
| 59049 ||  || — || October 10, 1998 || Anderson Mesa || LONEOS || L4 || align=right | 25 km || 
|-id=050 bgcolor=#d6d6d6
| 59050 ||  || — || October 14, 1998 || Anderson Mesa || LONEOS || 3:2 || align=right | 15 km || 
|-id=051 bgcolor=#fefefe
| 59051 ||  || — || October 14, 1998 || Anderson Mesa || LONEOS || NYS || align=right | 3.9 km || 
|-id=052 bgcolor=#fefefe
| 59052 ||  || — || October 14, 1998 || Anderson Mesa || LONEOS || — || align=right | 1.8 km || 
|-id=053 bgcolor=#fefefe
| 59053 ||  || — || October 20, 1998 || Kitt Peak || Spacewatch || NYS || align=right | 1.3 km || 
|-id=054 bgcolor=#E9E9E9
| 59054 ||  || — || October 22, 1998 || Caussols || ODAS || — || align=right | 4.8 km || 
|-id=055 bgcolor=#E9E9E9
| 59055 ||  || — || October 22, 1998 || Višnjan Observatory || K. Korlević || EUN || align=right | 3.1 km || 
|-id=056 bgcolor=#E9E9E9
| 59056 ||  || — || October 22, 1998 || Višnjan Observatory || K. Korlević || HEN || align=right | 2.1 km || 
|-id=057 bgcolor=#fefefe
| 59057 ||  || — || October 25, 1998 || Oizumi || T. Kobayashi || NYS || align=right | 1.8 km || 
|-id=058 bgcolor=#E9E9E9
| 59058 ||  || — || October 27, 1998 || Višnjan Observatory || K. Korlević || — || align=right | 6.2 km || 
|-id=059 bgcolor=#fefefe
| 59059 ||  || — || October 30, 1998 || Višnjan Observatory || K. Korlević || — || align=right | 4.5 km || 
|-id=060 bgcolor=#fefefe
| 59060 ||  || — || October 18, 1998 || La Silla || E. W. Elst || — || align=right | 1.4 km || 
|-id=061 bgcolor=#fefefe
| 59061 ||  || — || October 18, 1998 || La Silla || E. W. Elst || — || align=right | 1.6 km || 
|-id=062 bgcolor=#fefefe
| 59062 ||  || — || October 18, 1998 || La Silla || E. W. Elst || — || align=right | 1.7 km || 
|-id=063 bgcolor=#fefefe
| 59063 ||  || — || October 27, 1998 || Xinglong || SCAP || — || align=right | 3.1 km || 
|-id=064 bgcolor=#E9E9E9
| 59064 ||  || — || October 28, 1998 || Socorro || LINEAR || — || align=right | 3.7 km || 
|-id=065 bgcolor=#fefefe
| 59065 ||  || — || October 28, 1998 || Socorro || LINEAR || SUL || align=right | 6.6 km || 
|-id=066 bgcolor=#fefefe
| 59066 || 1998 VY || — || November 10, 1998 || Socorro || LINEAR || — || align=right | 4.0 km || 
|-id=067 bgcolor=#E9E9E9
| 59067 ||  || — || November 9, 1998 || Caussols || ODAS || MAR || align=right | 2.5 km || 
|-id=068 bgcolor=#E9E9E9
| 59068 ||  || — || November 9, 1998 || Caussols || ODAS || — || align=right | 3.2 km || 
|-id=069 bgcolor=#fefefe
| 59069 ||  || — || November 11, 1998 || Caussols || ODAS || — || align=right | 1.8 km || 
|-id=070 bgcolor=#fefefe
| 59070 ||  || — || November 11, 1998 || Nachi-Katsuura || Y. Shimizu, T. Urata || — || align=right | 2.6 km || 
|-id=071 bgcolor=#E9E9E9
| 59071 ||  || — || November 10, 1998 || Socorro || LINEAR || — || align=right | 4.6 km || 
|-id=072 bgcolor=#fefefe
| 59072 ||  || — || November 10, 1998 || Socorro || LINEAR || — || align=right | 4.7 km || 
|-id=073 bgcolor=#fefefe
| 59073 ||  || — || November 10, 1998 || Socorro || LINEAR || — || align=right | 2.5 km || 
|-id=074 bgcolor=#fefefe
| 59074 ||  || — || November 10, 1998 || Socorro || LINEAR || FLO || align=right | 1.4 km || 
|-id=075 bgcolor=#fefefe
| 59075 ||  || — || November 10, 1998 || Socorro || LINEAR || — || align=right | 2.1 km || 
|-id=076 bgcolor=#E9E9E9
| 59076 ||  || — || November 10, 1998 || Socorro || LINEAR || — || align=right | 5.5 km || 
|-id=077 bgcolor=#E9E9E9
| 59077 ||  || — || November 10, 1998 || Socorro || LINEAR || — || align=right | 2.8 km || 
|-id=078 bgcolor=#E9E9E9
| 59078 ||  || — || November 10, 1998 || Socorro || LINEAR || — || align=right | 2.2 km || 
|-id=079 bgcolor=#d6d6d6
| 59079 ||  || — || November 10, 1998 || Socorro || LINEAR || 3:2 || align=right | 18 km || 
|-id=080 bgcolor=#fefefe
| 59080 ||  || — || November 10, 1998 || Socorro || LINEAR || — || align=right | 1.9 km || 
|-id=081 bgcolor=#fefefe
| 59081 ||  || — || November 10, 1998 || Socorro || LINEAR || — || align=right | 1.6 km || 
|-id=082 bgcolor=#fefefe
| 59082 ||  || — || November 10, 1998 || Socorro || LINEAR || — || align=right | 1.7 km || 
|-id=083 bgcolor=#fefefe
| 59083 ||  || — || November 10, 1998 || Socorro || LINEAR || NYS || align=right | 2.1 km || 
|-id=084 bgcolor=#d6d6d6
| 59084 ||  || — || November 10, 1998 || Socorro || LINEAR || — || align=right | 10 km || 
|-id=085 bgcolor=#fefefe
| 59085 ||  || — || November 10, 1998 || Socorro || LINEAR || — || align=right | 2.1 km || 
|-id=086 bgcolor=#fefefe
| 59086 ||  || — || November 14, 1998 || Oizumi || T. Kobayashi || — || align=right | 3.2 km || 
|-id=087 bgcolor=#fefefe
| 59087 Maccacaro ||  ||  || November 15, 1998 || Sormano || P. Sicoli, F. Manca || — || align=right | 2.6 km || 
|-id=088 bgcolor=#fefefe
| 59088 ||  || — || November 9, 1998 || Xinglong || SCAP || — || align=right | 1.9 km || 
|-id=089 bgcolor=#fefefe
| 59089 ||  || — || November 10, 1998 || Socorro || LINEAR || NYS || align=right | 1.7 km || 
|-id=090 bgcolor=#fefefe
| 59090 ||  || — || November 14, 1998 || Kitt Peak || Spacewatch || — || align=right | 2.0 km || 
|-id=091 bgcolor=#fefefe
| 59091 ||  || — || November 15, 1998 || Kitt Peak || Spacewatch || — || align=right | 1.5 km || 
|-id=092 bgcolor=#fefefe
| 59092 ||  || — || November 15, 1998 || Kitt Peak || Spacewatch || — || align=right | 2.0 km || 
|-id=093 bgcolor=#E9E9E9
| 59093 ||  || — || November 14, 1998 || Kitt Peak || Spacewatch || — || align=right | 6.2 km || 
|-id=094 bgcolor=#fefefe
| 59094 ||  || — || November 11, 1998 || Socorro || LINEAR || — || align=right | 2.1 km || 
|-id=095 bgcolor=#E9E9E9
| 59095 || 1998 WK || — || November 16, 1998 || Prescott || P. G. Comba || — || align=right | 2.6 km || 
|-id=096 bgcolor=#fefefe
| 59096 ||  || — || November 18, 1998 || Kushiro || S. Ueda, H. Kaneda || — || align=right | 4.2 km || 
|-id=097 bgcolor=#fefefe
| 59097 ||  || — || November 20, 1998 || Valinhos || P. R. Holvorcem || NYS || align=right | 1.3 km || 
|-id=098 bgcolor=#E9E9E9
| 59098 ||  || — || November 20, 1998 || Valinhos || P. R. Holvorcem || — || align=right | 6.8 km || 
|-id=099 bgcolor=#E9E9E9
| 59099 ||  || — || November 21, 1998 || Socorro || LINEAR || — || align=right | 4.7 km || 
|-id=100 bgcolor=#E9E9E9
| 59100 ||  || — || November 21, 1998 || Socorro || LINEAR || — || align=right | 3.4 km || 
|}

59101–59200 

|-bgcolor=#E9E9E9
| 59101 ||  || — || November 21, 1998 || Socorro || LINEAR || — || align=right | 2.1 km || 
|-id=102 bgcolor=#fefefe
| 59102 ||  || — || November 21, 1998 || Socorro || LINEAR || — || align=right | 1.4 km || 
|-id=103 bgcolor=#E9E9E9
| 59103 ||  || — || November 21, 1998 || Socorro || LINEAR || — || align=right | 3.5 km || 
|-id=104 bgcolor=#E9E9E9
| 59104 ||  || — || November 21, 1998 || Socorro || LINEAR || — || align=right | 2.9 km || 
|-id=105 bgcolor=#fefefe
| 59105 ||  || — || November 18, 1998 || Socorro || LINEAR || MAS || align=right | 2.0 km || 
|-id=106 bgcolor=#fefefe
| 59106 ||  || — || November 18, 1998 || Socorro || LINEAR || — || align=right | 2.0 km || 
|-id=107 bgcolor=#E9E9E9
| 59107 ||  || — || November 17, 1998 || Kitt Peak || Spacewatch || — || align=right | 3.2 km || 
|-id=108 bgcolor=#fefefe
| 59108 ||  || — || November 17, 1998 || Kitt Peak || Spacewatch || NYS || align=right | 4.9 km || 
|-id=109 bgcolor=#fefefe
| 59109 ||  || — || November 21, 1998 || Kitt Peak || Spacewatch || V || align=right | 1.6 km || 
|-id=110 bgcolor=#fefefe
| 59110 ||  || — || November 29, 1998 || Burlington || T. Handley || — || align=right | 2.7 km || 
|-id=111 bgcolor=#E9E9E9
| 59111 ||  || — || November 23, 1998 || Anderson Mesa || LONEOS || — || align=right | 3.8 km || 
|-id=112 bgcolor=#d6d6d6
| 59112 ||  || — || November 18, 1998 || Kitt Peak || Spacewatch || 3:2 || align=right | 18 km || 
|-id=113 bgcolor=#E9E9E9
| 59113 || 1998 XQ || — || December 10, 1998 || Kleť || Kleť Obs. || — || align=right | 3.4 km || 
|-id=114 bgcolor=#fefefe
| 59114 ||  || — || December 7, 1998 || San Marcello || A. Boattini, L. Tesi || — || align=right | 1.8 km || 
|-id=115 bgcolor=#fefefe
| 59115 ||  || — || December 8, 1998 || Xinglong || SCAP || — || align=right | 2.8 km || 
|-id=116 bgcolor=#fefefe
| 59116 ||  || — || December 9, 1998 || Oizumi || T. Kobayashi || — || align=right | 1.8 km || 
|-id=117 bgcolor=#E9E9E9
| 59117 ||  || — || December 9, 1998 || Oizumi || T. Kobayashi || — || align=right | 6.2 km || 
|-id=118 bgcolor=#fefefe
| 59118 ||  || — || December 8, 1998 || Kitt Peak || Spacewatch || — || align=right | 1.9 km || 
|-id=119 bgcolor=#E9E9E9
| 59119 ||  || — || December 8, 1998 || Kitt Peak || Spacewatch || — || align=right | 2.3 km || 
|-id=120 bgcolor=#fefefe
| 59120 ||  || — || December 11, 1998 || Gekko || T. Kagawa || NYS || align=right | 1.4 km || 
|-id=121 bgcolor=#fefefe
| 59121 ||  || — || December 15, 1998 || Caussols || ODAS || MAS || align=right | 2.1 km || 
|-id=122 bgcolor=#E9E9E9
| 59122 ||  || — || December 15, 1998 || Caussols || ODAS || WIT || align=right | 2.4 km || 
|-id=123 bgcolor=#fefefe
| 59123 ||  || — || December 14, 1998 || Socorro || LINEAR || PHO || align=right | 4.6 km || 
|-id=124 bgcolor=#fefefe
| 59124 ||  || — || December 10, 1998 || Kitt Peak || Spacewatch || — || align=right | 1.7 km || 
|-id=125 bgcolor=#fefefe
| 59125 ||  || — || December 10, 1998 || Kitt Peak || Spacewatch || — || align=right | 3.4 km || 
|-id=126 bgcolor=#E9E9E9
| 59126 ||  || — || December 13, 1998 || Kitt Peak || Spacewatch || — || align=right | 3.0 km || 
|-id=127 bgcolor=#fefefe
| 59127 ||  || — || December 13, 1998 || Kitt Peak || Spacewatch || — || align=right | 2.0 km || 
|-id=128 bgcolor=#d6d6d6
| 59128 ||  || — || December 14, 1998 || Kitt Peak || Spacewatch || — || align=right | 4.5 km || 
|-id=129 bgcolor=#fefefe
| 59129 ||  || — || December 15, 1998 || Socorro || LINEAR || — || align=right | 2.9 km || 
|-id=130 bgcolor=#E9E9E9
| 59130 ||  || — || December 14, 1998 || Socorro || LINEAR || — || align=right | 2.3 km || 
|-id=131 bgcolor=#E9E9E9
| 59131 ||  || — || December 14, 1998 || Socorro || LINEAR || — || align=right | 2.2 km || 
|-id=132 bgcolor=#E9E9E9
| 59132 ||  || — || December 14, 1998 || Socorro || LINEAR || RAF || align=right | 3.5 km || 
|-id=133 bgcolor=#fefefe
| 59133 ||  || — || December 14, 1998 || Socorro || LINEAR || — || align=right | 2.2 km || 
|-id=134 bgcolor=#fefefe
| 59134 ||  || — || December 14, 1998 || Socorro || LINEAR || — || align=right | 1.8 km || 
|-id=135 bgcolor=#fefefe
| 59135 ||  || — || December 14, 1998 || Socorro || LINEAR || — || align=right | 3.0 km || 
|-id=136 bgcolor=#d6d6d6
| 59136 ||  || — || December 14, 1998 || Socorro || LINEAR || — || align=right | 8.7 km || 
|-id=137 bgcolor=#fefefe
| 59137 ||  || — || December 14, 1998 || Socorro || LINEAR || — || align=right | 1.8 km || 
|-id=138 bgcolor=#fefefe
| 59138 ||  || — || December 14, 1998 || Socorro || LINEAR || — || align=right | 1.6 km || 
|-id=139 bgcolor=#fefefe
| 59139 ||  || — || December 15, 1998 || Socorro || LINEAR || NYS || align=right | 1.4 km || 
|-id=140 bgcolor=#E9E9E9
| 59140 ||  || — || December 15, 1998 || Socorro || LINEAR || — || align=right | 3.5 km || 
|-id=141 bgcolor=#fefefe
| 59141 ||  || — || December 13, 1998 || Kitt Peak || Spacewatch || ERI || align=right | 4.1 km || 
|-id=142 bgcolor=#E9E9E9
| 59142 ||  || — || December 15, 1998 || Kitt Peak || Spacewatch || PAD || align=right | 3.7 km || 
|-id=143 bgcolor=#d6d6d6
| 59143 ||  || — || December 14, 1998 || Socorro || LINEAR || — || align=right | 5.9 km || 
|-id=144 bgcolor=#fefefe
| 59144 ||  || — || December 14, 1998 || Socorro || LINEAR || — || align=right | 2.7 km || 
|-id=145 bgcolor=#E9E9E9
| 59145 ||  || — || December 14, 1998 || Socorro || LINEAR || JUN || align=right | 2.0 km || 
|-id=146 bgcolor=#fefefe
| 59146 ||  || — || December 14, 1998 || Socorro || LINEAR || — || align=right | 2.5 km || 
|-id=147 bgcolor=#fefefe
| 59147 ||  || — || December 14, 1998 || Socorro || LINEAR || — || align=right | 2.1 km || 
|-id=148 bgcolor=#E9E9E9
| 59148 ||  || — || December 15, 1998 || Socorro || LINEAR || — || align=right | 4.8 km || 
|-id=149 bgcolor=#fefefe
| 59149 ||  || — || December 15, 1998 || Socorro || LINEAR || — || align=right | 3.5 km || 
|-id=150 bgcolor=#d6d6d6
| 59150 ||  || — || December 15, 1998 || Socorro || LINEAR || HYG || align=right | 8.8 km || 
|-id=151 bgcolor=#fefefe
| 59151 ||  || — || December 12, 1998 || Mérida || O. A. Naranjo || EUT || align=right | 1.6 km || 
|-id=152 bgcolor=#fefefe
| 59152 ||  || — || December 8, 1998 || Anderson Mesa || LONEOS || — || align=right | 2.8 km || 
|-id=153 bgcolor=#fefefe
| 59153 ||  || — || December 11, 1998 || Anderson Mesa || LONEOS || — || align=right | 1.7 km || 
|-id=154 bgcolor=#d6d6d6
| 59154 ||  || — || December 13, 1998 || Kitt Peak || Spacewatch || KOR || align=right | 2.7 km || 
|-id=155 bgcolor=#d6d6d6
| 59155 ||  || — || December 15, 1998 || Caussols || ODAS || HYG || align=right | 4.4 km || 
|-id=156 bgcolor=#fefefe
| 59156 ||  || — || December 17, 1998 || Oizumi || T. Kobayashi || FLO || align=right | 2.2 km || 
|-id=157 bgcolor=#fefefe
| 59157 ||  || — || December 19, 1998 || Oizumi || T. Kobayashi || — || align=right | 2.2 km || 
|-id=158 bgcolor=#fefefe
| 59158 ||  || — || December 20, 1998 || Catalina || CSS || PHO || align=right | 3.4 km || 
|-id=159 bgcolor=#fefefe
| 59159 ||  || — || December 24, 1998 || Prescott || P. G. Comba || V || align=right | 1.5 km || 
|-id=160 bgcolor=#d6d6d6
| 59160 ||  || — || December 24, 1998 || Oizumi || T. Kobayashi || — || align=right | 11 km || 
|-id=161 bgcolor=#fefefe
| 59161 ||  || — || December 27, 1998 || Prescott || P. G. Comba || — || align=right | 1.7 km || 
|-id=162 bgcolor=#E9E9E9
| 59162 ||  || — || December 18, 1998 || Caussols || ODAS || — || align=right | 5.0 km || 
|-id=163 bgcolor=#fefefe
| 59163 ||  || — || December 26, 1998 || Oizumi || T. Kobayashi || — || align=right | 1.6 km || 
|-id=164 bgcolor=#fefefe
| 59164 ||  || — || December 27, 1998 || Oizumi || T. Kobayashi || NYS || align=right | 1.8 km || 
|-id=165 bgcolor=#d6d6d6
| 59165 ||  || — || December 19, 1998 || Kitt Peak || Spacewatch || KOR || align=right | 3.3 km || 
|-id=166 bgcolor=#E9E9E9
| 59166 ||  || — || December 25, 1998 || Kitt Peak || Spacewatch || — || align=right | 2.2 km || 
|-id=167 bgcolor=#fefefe
| 59167 ||  || — || December 25, 1998 || Kitt Peak || Spacewatch || — || align=right | 1.4 km || 
|-id=168 bgcolor=#fefefe
| 59168 ||  || — || December 25, 1998 || Kitt Peak || Spacewatch || — || align=right | 2.1 km || 
|-id=169 bgcolor=#fefefe
| 59169 ||  || — || December 16, 1998 || Socorro || LINEAR || FLO || align=right | 3.4 km || 
|-id=170 bgcolor=#fefefe
| 59170 ||  || — || December 16, 1998 || Socorro || LINEAR || — || align=right | 2.1 km || 
|-id=171 bgcolor=#fefefe
| 59171 ||  || — || January 9, 1999 || Oizumi || T. Kobayashi || — || align=right | 3.6 km || 
|-id=172 bgcolor=#E9E9E9
| 59172 ||  || — || January 10, 1999 || Baton Rouge || W. R. Cooney Jr. || — || align=right | 2.1 km || 
|-id=173 bgcolor=#fefefe
| 59173 ||  || — || January 11, 1999 || Oizumi || T. Kobayashi || — || align=right | 3.6 km || 
|-id=174 bgcolor=#E9E9E9
| 59174 ||  || — || January 12, 1999 || Oizumi || T. Kobayashi || — || align=right | 4.5 km || 
|-id=175 bgcolor=#d6d6d6
| 59175 ||  || — || January 15, 1999 || Kitt Peak || Spacewatch || — || align=right | 7.3 km || 
|-id=176 bgcolor=#fefefe
| 59176 ||  || — || January 11, 1999 || Višnjan Observatory || K. Korlević || ERI || align=right | 3.0 km || 
|-id=177 bgcolor=#fefefe
| 59177 ||  || — || January 11, 1999 || Gekko || T. Kagawa || — || align=right | 2.5 km || 
|-id=178 bgcolor=#fefefe
| 59178 ||  || — || January 13, 1999 || Oizumi || T. Kobayashi || — || align=right | 4.8 km || 
|-id=179 bgcolor=#fefefe
| 59179 ||  || — || January 13, 1999 || Oizumi || T. Kobayashi || V || align=right | 2.2 km || 
|-id=180 bgcolor=#fefefe
| 59180 ||  || — || January 7, 1999 || Kitt Peak || Spacewatch || NYS || align=right | 1.3 km || 
|-id=181 bgcolor=#fefefe
| 59181 ||  || — || January 7, 1999 || Kitt Peak || Spacewatch || ERI || align=right | 3.3 km || 
|-id=182 bgcolor=#E9E9E9
| 59182 ||  || — || January 8, 1999 || Kitt Peak || Spacewatch || GEF || align=right | 2.8 km || 
|-id=183 bgcolor=#fefefe
| 59183 ||  || — || January 9, 1999 || Kitt Peak || Spacewatch || — || align=right | 2.7 km || 
|-id=184 bgcolor=#fefefe
| 59184 ||  || — || January 9, 1999 || Kitt Peak || Spacewatch || — || align=right | 2.5 km || 
|-id=185 bgcolor=#fefefe
| 59185 ||  || — || January 9, 1999 || Kitt Peak || Spacewatch || V || align=right | 2.5 km || 
|-id=186 bgcolor=#fefefe
| 59186 ||  || — || January 9, 1999 || Kitt Peak || Spacewatch || NYS || align=right | 1.4 km || 
|-id=187 bgcolor=#fefefe
| 59187 ||  || — || January 11, 1999 || Kitt Peak || Spacewatch || MAS || align=right | 1.4 km || 
|-id=188 bgcolor=#fefefe
| 59188 ||  || — || January 11, 1999 || Kitt Peak || Spacewatch || NYS || align=right | 2.0 km || 
|-id=189 bgcolor=#fefefe
| 59189 ||  || — || January 13, 1999 || Kitt Peak || Spacewatch || — || align=right | 2.0 km || 
|-id=190 bgcolor=#fefefe
| 59190 ||  || — || January 15, 1999 || Višnjan Observatory || K. Korlević || ERI || align=right | 5.9 km || 
|-id=191 bgcolor=#fefefe
| 59191 ||  || — || January 15, 1999 || Caussols || ODAS || V || align=right | 2.4 km || 
|-id=192 bgcolor=#fefefe
| 59192 ||  || — || January 14, 1999 || Kitt Peak || Spacewatch || — || align=right | 2.0 km || 
|-id=193 bgcolor=#fefefe
| 59193 ||  || — || January 14, 1999 || Kitt Peak || Spacewatch || MAS || align=right | 1.6 km || 
|-id=194 bgcolor=#fefefe
| 59194 ||  || — || January 18, 1999 || Višnjan Observatory || K. Korlević || NYS || align=right | 1.5 km || 
|-id=195 bgcolor=#E9E9E9
| 59195 ||  || — || January 19, 1999 || Catalina || CSS || — || align=right | 6.3 km || 
|-id=196 bgcolor=#fefefe
| 59196 ||  || — || January 19, 1999 || Kitt Peak || Spacewatch || — || align=right | 1.3 km || 
|-id=197 bgcolor=#fefefe
| 59197 ||  || — || January 20, 1999 || Kleť || Kleť Obs. || NYS || align=right data-sort-value="0.97" | 970 m || 
|-id=198 bgcolor=#fefefe
| 59198 ||  || — || January 19, 1999 || Višnjan Observatory || K. Korlević || — || align=right | 1.8 km || 
|-id=199 bgcolor=#fefefe
| 59199 ||  || — || January 20, 1999 || Caussols || ODAS || V || align=right | 1.9 km || 
|-id=200 bgcolor=#fefefe
| 59200 ||  || — || January 21, 1999 || Višnjan Observatory || K. Korlević || FLO || align=right | 1.9 km || 
|}

59201–59300 

|-bgcolor=#fefefe
| 59201 ||  || — || January 21, 1999 || Višnjan Observatory || K. Korlević || — || align=right | 1.2 km || 
|-id=202 bgcolor=#fefefe
| 59202 ||  || — || January 21, 1999 || Višnjan Observatory || K. Korlević || FLO || align=right | 1.8 km || 
|-id=203 bgcolor=#E9E9E9
| 59203 ||  || — || January 22, 1999 || Višnjan Observatory || K. Korlević || EUN || align=right | 3.8 km || 
|-id=204 bgcolor=#E9E9E9
| 59204 ||  || — || January 22, 1999 || Višnjan Observatory || K. Korlević || — || align=right | 4.7 km || 
|-id=205 bgcolor=#fefefe
| 59205 ||  || — || January 23, 1999 || Višnjan Observatory || K. Korlević || — || align=right | 1.9 km || 
|-id=206 bgcolor=#fefefe
| 59206 ||  || — || January 23, 1999 || Višnjan Observatory || K. Korlević || NYS || align=right | 2.2 km || 
|-id=207 bgcolor=#fefefe
| 59207 ||  || — || January 20, 1999 || Caussols || ODAS || — || align=right | 1.7 km || 
|-id=208 bgcolor=#fefefe
| 59208 ||  || — || January 24, 1999 || Višnjan Observatory || K. Korlević || — || align=right | 1.8 km || 
|-id=209 bgcolor=#fefefe
| 59209 ||  || — || January 24, 1999 || Višnjan Observatory || K. Korlević || V || align=right | 2.2 km || 
|-id=210 bgcolor=#fefefe
| 59210 ||  || — || January 25, 1999 || Višnjan Observatory || K. Korlević || — || align=right | 2.6 km || 
|-id=211 bgcolor=#fefefe
| 59211 ||  || — || January 20, 1999 || Caussols || ODAS || MAS || align=right | 1.7 km || 
|-id=212 bgcolor=#fefefe
| 59212 ||  || — || January 20, 1999 || Caussols || ODAS || — || align=right | 1.9 km || 
|-id=213 bgcolor=#fefefe
| 59213 ||  || — || January 25, 1999 || High Point || D. K. Chesney || — || align=right | 2.4 km || 
|-id=214 bgcolor=#fefefe
| 59214 ||  || — || January 20, 1999 || Uenohara || N. Kawasato || NYS || align=right | 4.1 km || 
|-id=215 bgcolor=#fefefe
| 59215 ||  || — || January 21, 1999 || Višnjan Observatory || K. Korlević || V || align=right | 1.9 km || 
|-id=216 bgcolor=#E9E9E9
| 59216 ||  || — || January 25, 1999 || Višnjan Observatory || K. Korlević || — || align=right | 4.3 km || 
|-id=217 bgcolor=#fefefe
| 59217 ||  || — || January 16, 1999 || Socorro || LINEAR || — || align=right | 1.7 km || 
|-id=218 bgcolor=#d6d6d6
| 59218 ||  || — || January 16, 1999 || Socorro || LINEAR || — || align=right | 5.2 km || 
|-id=219 bgcolor=#d6d6d6
| 59219 ||  || — || January 18, 1999 || Socorro || LINEAR || — || align=right | 7.6 km || 
|-id=220 bgcolor=#fefefe
| 59220 ||  || — || January 18, 1999 || Socorro || LINEAR || — || align=right | 2.3 km || 
|-id=221 bgcolor=#fefefe
| 59221 ||  || — || January 18, 1999 || Kitt Peak || Spacewatch || — || align=right | 1.7 km || 
|-id=222 bgcolor=#fefefe
| 59222 ||  || — || January 19, 1999 || Kitt Peak || Spacewatch || NYS || align=right | 1.6 km || 
|-id=223 bgcolor=#fefefe
| 59223 ||  || — || January 19, 1999 || Kitt Peak || Spacewatch || FLO || align=right | 1.8 km || 
|-id=224 bgcolor=#fefefe
| 59224 ||  || — || January 19, 1999 || Socorro || LINEAR || — || align=right | 1.7 km || 
|-id=225 bgcolor=#fefefe
| 59225 || 1999 CC || — || February 4, 1999 || Oizumi || T. Kobayashi || — || align=right | 2.7 km || 
|-id=226 bgcolor=#fefefe
| 59226 || 1999 CE || — || February 4, 1999 || Oizumi || T. Kobayashi || V || align=right | 2.6 km || 
|-id=227 bgcolor=#fefefe
| 59227 || 1999 CG || — || February 4, 1999 || Oizumi || T. Kobayashi || — || align=right | 2.2 km || 
|-id=228 bgcolor=#fefefe
| 59228 || 1999 CH || — || February 4, 1999 || Oizumi || T. Kobayashi || V || align=right | 2.7 km || 
|-id=229 bgcolor=#fefefe
| 59229 || 1999 CQ || — || February 5, 1999 || Oizumi || T. Kobayashi || NYS || align=right | 1.6 km || 
|-id=230 bgcolor=#fefefe
| 59230 || 1999 CY || — || February 5, 1999 || Oizumi || T. Kobayashi || FLO || align=right | 2.5 km || 
|-id=231 bgcolor=#fefefe
| 59231 || 1999 CZ || — || February 5, 1999 || Oizumi || T. Kobayashi || — || align=right | 2.3 km || 
|-id=232 bgcolor=#fefefe
| 59232 Sfiligoi ||  ||  || February 6, 1999 || Farra d'Isonzo || Farra d'Isonzo || — || align=right | 4.3 km || 
|-id=233 bgcolor=#fefefe
| 59233 ||  || — || February 6, 1999 || Oizumi || T. Kobayashi || — || align=right | 3.6 km || 
|-id=234 bgcolor=#E9E9E9
| 59234 ||  || — || February 7, 1999 || Oizumi || T. Kobayashi || MAR || align=right | 2.7 km || 
|-id=235 bgcolor=#fefefe
| 59235 ||  || — || February 7, 1999 || Oizumi || T. Kobayashi || — || align=right | 3.0 km || 
|-id=236 bgcolor=#fefefe
| 59236 ||  || — || February 8, 1999 || Oizumi || T. Kobayashi || FLO || align=right | 3.9 km || 
|-id=237 bgcolor=#fefefe
| 59237 ||  || — || February 8, 1999 || Ondřejov || L. Kotková || — || align=right | 1.6 km || 
|-id=238 bgcolor=#fefefe
| 59238 ||  || — || February 5, 1999 || Xinglong || SCAP || MAS || align=right | 2.0 km || 
|-id=239 bgcolor=#fefefe
| 59239 Alhazen ||  ||  || February 7, 1999 || Gnosca || S. Sposetti || — || align=right | 3.1 km || 
|-id=240 bgcolor=#fefefe
| 59240 ||  || — || February 7, 1999 || San Marcello || A. Boattini || NYS || align=right | 4.4 km || 
|-id=241 bgcolor=#fefefe
| 59241 ||  || — || February 6, 1999 || Xinglong || SCAP || FLO || align=right | 2.7 km || 
|-id=242 bgcolor=#fefefe
| 59242 ||  || — || February 12, 1999 || Višnjan Observatory || K. Korlević || NYS || align=right | 3.4 km || 
|-id=243 bgcolor=#fefefe
| 59243 ||  || — || February 12, 1999 || Oohira || T. Urata || — || align=right | 2.3 km || 
|-id=244 bgcolor=#E9E9E9
| 59244 ||  || — || February 10, 1999 || Socorro || LINEAR || — || align=right | 7.2 km || 
|-id=245 bgcolor=#fefefe
| 59245 ||  || — || February 10, 1999 || Socorro || LINEAR || — || align=right | 3.2 km || 
|-id=246 bgcolor=#fefefe
| 59246 ||  || — || February 12, 1999 || Višnjan Observatory || K. Korlević || — || align=right | 2.6 km || 
|-id=247 bgcolor=#E9E9E9
| 59247 ||  || — || February 12, 1999 || Socorro || LINEAR || — || align=right | 5.8 km || 
|-id=248 bgcolor=#fefefe
| 59248 ||  || — || February 14, 1999 || Caussols || ODAS || — || align=right | 1.9 km || 
|-id=249 bgcolor=#fefefe
| 59249 ||  || — || February 11, 1999 || Socorro || LINEAR || — || align=right | 3.1 km || 
|-id=250 bgcolor=#fefefe
| 59250 ||  || — || February 11, 1999 || Socorro || LINEAR || PHO || align=right | 2.4 km || 
|-id=251 bgcolor=#fefefe
| 59251 ||  || — || February 10, 1999 || Socorro || LINEAR || — || align=right | 1.8 km || 
|-id=252 bgcolor=#fefefe
| 59252 ||  || — || February 10, 1999 || Socorro || LINEAR || — || align=right | 3.9 km || 
|-id=253 bgcolor=#fefefe
| 59253 ||  || — || February 10, 1999 || Socorro || LINEAR || NYS || align=right | 3.6 km || 
|-id=254 bgcolor=#E9E9E9
| 59254 ||  || — || February 10, 1999 || Socorro || LINEAR || — || align=right | 5.4 km || 
|-id=255 bgcolor=#fefefe
| 59255 ||  || — || February 10, 1999 || Socorro || LINEAR || MAS || align=right | 2.1 km || 
|-id=256 bgcolor=#fefefe
| 59256 ||  || — || February 10, 1999 || Socorro || LINEAR || V || align=right | 2.0 km || 
|-id=257 bgcolor=#fefefe
| 59257 ||  || — || February 10, 1999 || Socorro || LINEAR || — || align=right | 2.2 km || 
|-id=258 bgcolor=#fefefe
| 59258 ||  || — || February 10, 1999 || Socorro || LINEAR || NYS || align=right | 1.6 km || 
|-id=259 bgcolor=#fefefe
| 59259 ||  || — || February 10, 1999 || Socorro || LINEAR || — || align=right | 2.3 km || 
|-id=260 bgcolor=#fefefe
| 59260 ||  || — || February 10, 1999 || Socorro || LINEAR || — || align=right | 1.7 km || 
|-id=261 bgcolor=#E9E9E9
| 59261 ||  || — || February 10, 1999 || Socorro || LINEAR || — || align=right | 7.1 km || 
|-id=262 bgcolor=#fefefe
| 59262 ||  || — || February 10, 1999 || Socorro || LINEAR || — || align=right | 2.0 km || 
|-id=263 bgcolor=#fefefe
| 59263 ||  || — || February 10, 1999 || Socorro || LINEAR || MAS || align=right | 1.9 km || 
|-id=264 bgcolor=#fefefe
| 59264 ||  || — || February 10, 1999 || Socorro || LINEAR || NYS || align=right | 1.5 km || 
|-id=265 bgcolor=#fefefe
| 59265 ||  || — || February 10, 1999 || Socorro || LINEAR || — || align=right | 2.0 km || 
|-id=266 bgcolor=#fefefe
| 59266 ||  || — || February 10, 1999 || Socorro || LINEAR || V || align=right | 1.9 km || 
|-id=267 bgcolor=#fefefe
| 59267 ||  || — || February 10, 1999 || Socorro || LINEAR || V || align=right | 1.8 km || 
|-id=268 bgcolor=#fefefe
| 59268 ||  || — || February 10, 1999 || Socorro || LINEAR || — || align=right | 2.2 km || 
|-id=269 bgcolor=#fefefe
| 59269 ||  || — || February 10, 1999 || Socorro || LINEAR || — || align=right | 2.2 km || 
|-id=270 bgcolor=#fefefe
| 59270 ||  || — || February 10, 1999 || Socorro || LINEAR || — || align=right | 2.0 km || 
|-id=271 bgcolor=#fefefe
| 59271 ||  || — || February 10, 1999 || Socorro || LINEAR || NYS || align=right | 1.3 km || 
|-id=272 bgcolor=#fefefe
| 59272 ||  || — || February 10, 1999 || Socorro || LINEAR || — || align=right | 2.0 km || 
|-id=273 bgcolor=#fefefe
| 59273 ||  || — || February 10, 1999 || Socorro || LINEAR || — || align=right | 2.7 km || 
|-id=274 bgcolor=#fefefe
| 59274 ||  || — || February 10, 1999 || Socorro || LINEAR || — || align=right | 1.7 km || 
|-id=275 bgcolor=#d6d6d6
| 59275 ||  || — || February 10, 1999 || Socorro || LINEAR || HYG || align=right | 5.2 km || 
|-id=276 bgcolor=#fefefe
| 59276 ||  || — || February 10, 1999 || Socorro || LINEAR || V || align=right | 2.7 km || 
|-id=277 bgcolor=#fefefe
| 59277 ||  || — || February 10, 1999 || Socorro || LINEAR || — || align=right | 2.3 km || 
|-id=278 bgcolor=#fefefe
| 59278 ||  || — || February 10, 1999 || Socorro || LINEAR || — || align=right | 5.0 km || 
|-id=279 bgcolor=#fefefe
| 59279 ||  || — || February 10, 1999 || Socorro || LINEAR || — || align=right | 1.1 km || 
|-id=280 bgcolor=#fefefe
| 59280 ||  || — || February 10, 1999 || Socorro || LINEAR || — || align=right | 2.0 km || 
|-id=281 bgcolor=#fefefe
| 59281 ||  || — || February 10, 1999 || Socorro || LINEAR || V || align=right | 2.3 km || 
|-id=282 bgcolor=#fefefe
| 59282 ||  || — || February 10, 1999 || Socorro || LINEAR || — || align=right | 2.0 km || 
|-id=283 bgcolor=#E9E9E9
| 59283 ||  || — || February 10, 1999 || Socorro || LINEAR || — || align=right | 2.9 km || 
|-id=284 bgcolor=#fefefe
| 59284 ||  || — || February 10, 1999 || Socorro || LINEAR || — || align=right | 2.2 km || 
|-id=285 bgcolor=#fefefe
| 59285 ||  || — || February 10, 1999 || Socorro || LINEAR || FLO || align=right | 3.8 km || 
|-id=286 bgcolor=#E9E9E9
| 59286 ||  || — || February 10, 1999 || Socorro || LINEAR || — || align=right | 2.8 km || 
|-id=287 bgcolor=#d6d6d6
| 59287 ||  || — || February 10, 1999 || Socorro || LINEAR || — || align=right | 7.7 km || 
|-id=288 bgcolor=#fefefe
| 59288 ||  || — || February 10, 1999 || Socorro || LINEAR || — || align=right | 2.1 km || 
|-id=289 bgcolor=#fefefe
| 59289 ||  || — || February 10, 1999 || Socorro || LINEAR || — || align=right | 2.0 km || 
|-id=290 bgcolor=#fefefe
| 59290 ||  || — || February 10, 1999 || Socorro || LINEAR || — || align=right | 2.6 km || 
|-id=291 bgcolor=#fefefe
| 59291 ||  || — || February 10, 1999 || Socorro || LINEAR || V || align=right | 3.1 km || 
|-id=292 bgcolor=#fefefe
| 59292 ||  || — || February 10, 1999 || Socorro || LINEAR || — || align=right | 3.5 km || 
|-id=293 bgcolor=#E9E9E9
| 59293 ||  || — || February 10, 1999 || Socorro || LINEAR || — || align=right | 4.8 km || 
|-id=294 bgcolor=#fefefe
| 59294 ||  || — || February 10, 1999 || Socorro || LINEAR || V || align=right | 2.0 km || 
|-id=295 bgcolor=#fefefe
| 59295 ||  || — || February 10, 1999 || Socorro || LINEAR || V || align=right | 1.7 km || 
|-id=296 bgcolor=#E9E9E9
| 59296 ||  || — || February 12, 1999 || Socorro || LINEAR || — || align=right | 8.0 km || 
|-id=297 bgcolor=#fefefe
| 59297 ||  || — || February 12, 1999 || Socorro || LINEAR || NYS || align=right | 2.2 km || 
|-id=298 bgcolor=#fefefe
| 59298 ||  || — || February 12, 1999 || Socorro || LINEAR || V || align=right | 2.3 km || 
|-id=299 bgcolor=#fefefe
| 59299 ||  || — || February 12, 1999 || Socorro || LINEAR || V || align=right | 2.1 km || 
|-id=300 bgcolor=#fefefe
| 59300 ||  || — || February 12, 1999 || Socorro || LINEAR || — || align=right | 1.6 km || 
|}

59301–59400 

|-bgcolor=#fefefe
| 59301 ||  || — || February 12, 1999 || Socorro || LINEAR || — || align=right | 3.6 km || 
|-id=302 bgcolor=#fefefe
| 59302 ||  || — || February 12, 1999 || Socorro || LINEAR || — || align=right | 1.6 km || 
|-id=303 bgcolor=#fefefe
| 59303 ||  || — || February 12, 1999 || Socorro || LINEAR || — || align=right | 1.8 km || 
|-id=304 bgcolor=#fefefe
| 59304 ||  || — || February 12, 1999 || Socorro || LINEAR || NYS || align=right | 1.9 km || 
|-id=305 bgcolor=#fefefe
| 59305 ||  || — || February 12, 1999 || Socorro || LINEAR || FLO || align=right | 2.7 km || 
|-id=306 bgcolor=#fefefe
| 59306 ||  || — || February 12, 1999 || Socorro || LINEAR || — || align=right | 2.7 km || 
|-id=307 bgcolor=#fefefe
| 59307 ||  || — || February 12, 1999 || Socorro || LINEAR || FLO || align=right | 2.3 km || 
|-id=308 bgcolor=#E9E9E9
| 59308 ||  || — || February 10, 1999 || Socorro || LINEAR || — || align=right | 3.0 km || 
|-id=309 bgcolor=#fefefe
| 59309 ||  || — || February 10, 1999 || Socorro || LINEAR || FLO || align=right | 1.8 km || 
|-id=310 bgcolor=#fefefe
| 59310 ||  || — || February 10, 1999 || Socorro || LINEAR || — || align=right | 2.2 km || 
|-id=311 bgcolor=#fefefe
| 59311 ||  || — || February 10, 1999 || Socorro || LINEAR || MAS || align=right | 2.0 km || 
|-id=312 bgcolor=#fefefe
| 59312 ||  || — || February 10, 1999 || Socorro || LINEAR || NYS || align=right | 1.3 km || 
|-id=313 bgcolor=#E9E9E9
| 59313 ||  || — || February 10, 1999 || Socorro || LINEAR || DOR || align=right | 9.3 km || 
|-id=314 bgcolor=#fefefe
| 59314 ||  || — || February 10, 1999 || Socorro || LINEAR || — || align=right | 3.9 km || 
|-id=315 bgcolor=#fefefe
| 59315 ||  || — || February 10, 1999 || Socorro || LINEAR || NYS || align=right | 1.7 km || 
|-id=316 bgcolor=#E9E9E9
| 59316 ||  || — || February 10, 1999 || Socorro || LINEAR || — || align=right | 2.9 km || 
|-id=317 bgcolor=#fefefe
| 59317 ||  || — || February 10, 1999 || Socorro || LINEAR || NYS || align=right | 4.0 km || 
|-id=318 bgcolor=#fefefe
| 59318 ||  || — || February 10, 1999 || Socorro || LINEAR || — || align=right | 2.9 km || 
|-id=319 bgcolor=#fefefe
| 59319 ||  || — || February 10, 1999 || Socorro || LINEAR || — || align=right | 2.6 km || 
|-id=320 bgcolor=#fefefe
| 59320 ||  || — || February 10, 1999 || Socorro || LINEAR || V || align=right | 2.1 km || 
|-id=321 bgcolor=#fefefe
| 59321 ||  || — || February 10, 1999 || Socorro || LINEAR || NYS || align=right | 1.7 km || 
|-id=322 bgcolor=#fefefe
| 59322 ||  || — || February 10, 1999 || Socorro || LINEAR || NYS || align=right | 1.8 km || 
|-id=323 bgcolor=#fefefe
| 59323 ||  || — || February 10, 1999 || Socorro || LINEAR || — || align=right | 2.5 km || 
|-id=324 bgcolor=#fefefe
| 59324 ||  || — || February 10, 1999 || Socorro || LINEAR || NYS || align=right | 3.1 km || 
|-id=325 bgcolor=#fefefe
| 59325 ||  || — || February 10, 1999 || Socorro || LINEAR || — || align=right | 3.6 km || 
|-id=326 bgcolor=#fefefe
| 59326 ||  || — || February 10, 1999 || Socorro || LINEAR || — || align=right | 2.4 km || 
|-id=327 bgcolor=#fefefe
| 59327 ||  || — || February 10, 1999 || Socorro || LINEAR || — || align=right | 2.5 km || 
|-id=328 bgcolor=#E9E9E9
| 59328 ||  || — || February 12, 1999 || Socorro || LINEAR || — || align=right | 3.4 km || 
|-id=329 bgcolor=#fefefe
| 59329 ||  || — || February 12, 1999 || Socorro || LINEAR || — || align=right | 2.5 km || 
|-id=330 bgcolor=#fefefe
| 59330 ||  || — || February 12, 1999 || Socorro || LINEAR || V || align=right | 1.9 km || 
|-id=331 bgcolor=#E9E9E9
| 59331 ||  || — || February 12, 1999 || Socorro || LINEAR || — || align=right | 5.3 km || 
|-id=332 bgcolor=#fefefe
| 59332 ||  || — || February 12, 1999 || Socorro || LINEAR || — || align=right | 6.2 km || 
|-id=333 bgcolor=#fefefe
| 59333 ||  || — || February 12, 1999 || Socorro || LINEAR || — || align=right | 4.1 km || 
|-id=334 bgcolor=#fefefe
| 59334 ||  || — || February 12, 1999 || Socorro || LINEAR || — || align=right | 2.1 km || 
|-id=335 bgcolor=#E9E9E9
| 59335 ||  || — || February 12, 1999 || Socorro || LINEAR || — || align=right | 3.0 km || 
|-id=336 bgcolor=#fefefe
| 59336 ||  || — || February 12, 1999 || Socorro || LINEAR || V || align=right | 2.6 km || 
|-id=337 bgcolor=#d6d6d6
| 59337 ||  || — || February 12, 1999 || Socorro || LINEAR || EOS || align=right | 6.0 km || 
|-id=338 bgcolor=#E9E9E9
| 59338 ||  || — || February 12, 1999 || Socorro || LINEAR || — || align=right | 5.4 km || 
|-id=339 bgcolor=#fefefe
| 59339 ||  || — || February 12, 1999 || Socorro || LINEAR || — || align=right | 2.1 km || 
|-id=340 bgcolor=#E9E9E9
| 59340 ||  || — || February 12, 1999 || Socorro || LINEAR || — || align=right | 5.8 km || 
|-id=341 bgcolor=#E9E9E9
| 59341 ||  || — || February 12, 1999 || Socorro || LINEAR || — || align=right | 2.5 km || 
|-id=342 bgcolor=#fefefe
| 59342 ||  || — || February 9, 1999 || Xinglong || SCAP || PHO || align=right | 3.9 km || 
|-id=343 bgcolor=#fefefe
| 59343 ||  || — || February 11, 1999 || Socorro || LINEAR || — || align=right | 4.3 km || 
|-id=344 bgcolor=#E9E9E9
| 59344 ||  || — || February 11, 1999 || Socorro || LINEAR || — || align=right | 4.3 km || 
|-id=345 bgcolor=#fefefe
| 59345 ||  || — || February 8, 1999 || Kitt Peak || Spacewatch || V || align=right | 2.1 km || 
|-id=346 bgcolor=#fefefe
| 59346 ||  || — || February 9, 1999 || Kitt Peak || Spacewatch || — || align=right | 2.5 km || 
|-id=347 bgcolor=#fefefe
| 59347 ||  || — || February 9, 1999 || Kitt Peak || Spacewatch || — || align=right | 3.2 km || 
|-id=348 bgcolor=#fefefe
| 59348 ||  || — || February 10, 1999 || Kitt Peak || Spacewatch || — || align=right | 1.4 km || 
|-id=349 bgcolor=#fefefe
| 59349 ||  || — || February 10, 1999 || Kitt Peak || Spacewatch || NYS || align=right | 1.2 km || 
|-id=350 bgcolor=#fefefe
| 59350 ||  || — || February 10, 1999 || Kitt Peak || Spacewatch || NYS || align=right | 1.2 km || 
|-id=351 bgcolor=#E9E9E9
| 59351 ||  || — || February 8, 1999 || Kitt Peak || Spacewatch || — || align=right | 3.1 km || 
|-id=352 bgcolor=#fefefe
| 59352 ||  || — || February 9, 1999 || Kitt Peak || Spacewatch || — || align=right | 2.3 km || 
|-id=353 bgcolor=#fefefe
| 59353 ||  || — || February 9, 1999 || Kitt Peak || Spacewatch || — || align=right | 2.7 km || 
|-id=354 bgcolor=#fefefe
| 59354 ||  || — || February 12, 1999 || Kitt Peak || Spacewatch || V || align=right | 1.5 km || 
|-id=355 bgcolor=#C2FFFF
| 59355 ||  || — || February 14, 1999 || Kitt Peak || Spacewatch || L4 || align=right | 14 km || 
|-id=356 bgcolor=#fefefe
| 59356 ||  || — || February 13, 1999 || Anderson Mesa || LONEOS || FLO || align=right | 2.0 km || 
|-id=357 bgcolor=#fefefe
| 59357 ||  || — || February 14, 1999 || Anderson Mesa || LONEOS || — || align=right | 2.2 km || 
|-id=358 bgcolor=#C2E0FF
| 59358 ||  || — || February 11, 1999 || Mauna Kea || J. X. Luu, C. Trujillo, D. C. Jewitt || cubewano? || align=right | 185 km || 
|-id=359 bgcolor=#fefefe
| 59359 || 1999 DV || — || February 16, 1999 || Gekko || T. Kagawa || NYS || align=right | 2.5 km || 
|-id=360 bgcolor=#fefefe
| 59360 ||  || — || February 18, 1999 || Haleakala || NEAT || FLO || align=right | 2.3 km || 
|-id=361 bgcolor=#fefefe
| 59361 ||  || — || February 20, 1999 || Oohira || T. Urata || V || align=right | 1.4 km || 
|-id=362 bgcolor=#E9E9E9
| 59362 ||  || — || February 17, 1999 || Socorro || LINEAR || MAR || align=right | 3.2 km || 
|-id=363 bgcolor=#fefefe
| 59363 ||  || — || February 18, 1999 || Anderson Mesa || LONEOS || NYS || align=right | 3.7 km || 
|-id=364 bgcolor=#fefefe
| 59364 ||  || — || February 18, 1999 || Anderson Mesa || LONEOS || V || align=right | 2.8 km || 
|-id=365 bgcolor=#fefefe
| 59365 || 1999 EM || — || March 9, 1999 || Fountain Hills || C. W. Juels || NYS || align=right | 2.2 km || 
|-id=366 bgcolor=#d6d6d6
| 59366 ||  || — || March 12, 1999 || Prescott || P. G. Comba || EOS || align=right | 5.1 km || 
|-id=367 bgcolor=#fefefe
| 59367 ||  || — || March 15, 1999 || Prescott || P. G. Comba || NYS || align=right | 1.9 km || 
|-id=368 bgcolor=#E9E9E9
| 59368 ||  || — || March 12, 1999 || Kitt Peak || Spacewatch || GER || align=right | 5.1 km || 
|-id=369 bgcolor=#d6d6d6
| 59369 Chanco ||  ||  || March 11, 1999 || Uccle || T. Pauwels || — || align=right | 5.1 km || 
|-id=370 bgcolor=#fefefe
| 59370 ||  || — || March 15, 1999 || King City, Ontario Observatory || R. G. Sandness || — || align=right | 2.3 km || 
|-id=371 bgcolor=#fefefe
| 59371 ||  || — || March 14, 1999 || Kitt Peak || Spacewatch || — || align=right | 8.3 km || 
|-id=372 bgcolor=#fefefe
| 59372 ||  || — || March 14, 1999 || Kitt Peak || Spacewatch || NYS || align=right | 1.0 km || 
|-id=373 bgcolor=#fefefe
| 59373 ||  || — || March 14, 1999 || Kitt Peak || Spacewatch || NYS || align=right | 2.3 km || 
|-id=374 bgcolor=#d6d6d6
| 59374 ||  || — || March 15, 1999 || Socorro || LINEAR || — || align=right | 3.3 km || 
|-id=375 bgcolor=#d6d6d6
| 59375 ||  || — || March 10, 1999 || Kitt Peak || Spacewatch || EOS || align=right | 4.3 km || 
|-id=376 bgcolor=#fefefe
| 59376 || 1999 FK || — || March 17, 1999 || Farra d'Isonzo || Farra d'Isonzo || V || align=right | 2.4 km || 
|-id=377 bgcolor=#E9E9E9
| 59377 ||  || — || March 17, 1999 || Caussols || ODAS || — || align=right | 6.2 km || 
|-id=378 bgcolor=#d6d6d6
| 59378 ||  || — || March 19, 1999 || Modra || A. Galád, J. Tóth || KOR || align=right | 4.0 km || 
|-id=379 bgcolor=#E9E9E9
| 59379 ||  || — || March 17, 1999 || Kitt Peak || Spacewatch || — || align=right | 2.8 km || 
|-id=380 bgcolor=#E9E9E9
| 59380 ||  || — || March 17, 1999 || Kitt Peak || Spacewatch || — || align=right | 2.4 km || 
|-id=381 bgcolor=#fefefe
| 59381 ||  || — || March 16, 1999 || Caussols || ODAS || NYS || align=right | 3.9 km || 
|-id=382 bgcolor=#E9E9E9
| 59382 ||  || — || March 17, 1999 || Caussols || ODAS || — || align=right | 1.6 km || 
|-id=383 bgcolor=#fefefe
| 59383 ||  || — || March 22, 1999 || Anderson Mesa || LONEOS || NYS || align=right | 2.0 km || 
|-id=384 bgcolor=#fefefe
| 59384 ||  || — || March 22, 1999 || San Marcello || L. Tesi, A. Boattini || — || align=right | 4.1 km || 
|-id=385 bgcolor=#E9E9E9
| 59385 ||  || — || March 19, 1999 || Kitt Peak || Spacewatch || — || align=right | 2.5 km || 
|-id=386 bgcolor=#E9E9E9
| 59386 ||  || — || March 23, 1999 || Kitt Peak || Spacewatch || — || align=right | 4.3 km || 
|-id=387 bgcolor=#fefefe
| 59387 ||  || — || March 23, 1999 || Kitt Peak || Spacewatch || — || align=right | 2.0 km || 
|-id=388 bgcolor=#fefefe
| 59388 Monod ||  ||  || March 24, 1999 || Monte Agliale || M. M. M. Santangelo || — || align=right | 2.0 km || 
|-id=389 bgcolor=#fefefe
| 59389 Oskarvonmiller ||  ||  || March 24, 1999 || Modra || L. Kornoš, J. Tóth || — || align=right | 2.0 km || 
|-id=390 bgcolor=#d6d6d6
| 59390 Habermas ||  ||  || March 24, 1999 || Monte Agliale || M. M. M. Santangelo || CHA || align=right | 6.2 km || 
|-id=391 bgcolor=#E9E9E9
| 59391 ||  || — || March 19, 1999 || Socorro || LINEAR || — || align=right | 3.1 km || 
|-id=392 bgcolor=#fefefe
| 59392 ||  || — || March 19, 1999 || Socorro || LINEAR || NYS || align=right | 1.8 km || 
|-id=393 bgcolor=#E9E9E9
| 59393 ||  || — || March 19, 1999 || Socorro || LINEAR || — || align=right | 3.4 km || 
|-id=394 bgcolor=#fefefe
| 59394 ||  || — || March 19, 1999 || Socorro || LINEAR || NYS || align=right | 3.0 km || 
|-id=395 bgcolor=#fefefe
| 59395 ||  || — || March 19, 1999 || Socorro || LINEAR || — || align=right | 1.8 km || 
|-id=396 bgcolor=#fefefe
| 59396 ||  || — || March 19, 1999 || Socorro || LINEAR || FLO || align=right | 1.9 km || 
|-id=397 bgcolor=#fefefe
| 59397 ||  || — || March 19, 1999 || Socorro || LINEAR || NYS || align=right | 2.9 km || 
|-id=398 bgcolor=#fefefe
| 59398 ||  || — || March 19, 1999 || Socorro || LINEAR || — || align=right | 2.5 km || 
|-id=399 bgcolor=#fefefe
| 59399 ||  || — || March 19, 1999 || Socorro || LINEAR || — || align=right | 3.1 km || 
|-id=400 bgcolor=#fefefe
| 59400 ||  || — || March 19, 1999 || Socorro || LINEAR || — || align=right | 6.3 km || 
|}

59401–59500 

|-bgcolor=#fefefe
| 59401 ||  || — || March 19, 1999 || Socorro || LINEAR || — || align=right | 3.2 km || 
|-id=402 bgcolor=#fefefe
| 59402 ||  || — || March 23, 1999 || Višnjan Observatory || K. Korlević || — || align=right | 5.2 km || 
|-id=403 bgcolor=#E9E9E9
| 59403 ||  || — || March 19, 1999 || Socorro || LINEAR || — || align=right | 5.0 km || 
|-id=404 bgcolor=#E9E9E9
| 59404 ||  || — || March 19, 1999 || Socorro || LINEAR || GEF || align=right | 4.8 km || 
|-id=405 bgcolor=#E9E9E9
| 59405 ||  || — || March 19, 1999 || Socorro || LINEAR || MAR || align=right | 3.0 km || 
|-id=406 bgcolor=#fefefe
| 59406 ||  || — || March 20, 1999 || Socorro || LINEAR || NYS || align=right | 3.2 km || 
|-id=407 bgcolor=#fefefe
| 59407 ||  || — || March 20, 1999 || Socorro || LINEAR || — || align=right | 2.3 km || 
|-id=408 bgcolor=#fefefe
| 59408 ||  || — || March 20, 1999 || Socorro || LINEAR || — || align=right | 2.2 km || 
|-id=409 bgcolor=#fefefe
| 59409 ||  || — || March 20, 1999 || Socorro || LINEAR || — || align=right | 3.9 km || 
|-id=410 bgcolor=#fefefe
| 59410 ||  || — || March 20, 1999 || Socorro || LINEAR || V || align=right | 1.9 km || 
|-id=411 bgcolor=#fefefe
| 59411 ||  || — || March 20, 1999 || Socorro || LINEAR || V || align=right | 3.8 km || 
|-id=412 bgcolor=#fefefe
| 59412 ||  || — || March 20, 1999 || Socorro || LINEAR || NYS || align=right | 4.7 km || 
|-id=413 bgcolor=#fefefe
| 59413 ||  || — || March 20, 1999 || Socorro || LINEAR || V || align=right | 1.6 km || 
|-id=414 bgcolor=#fefefe
| 59414 ||  || — || March 22, 1999 || Anderson Mesa || LONEOS || NYS || align=right | 1.6 km || 
|-id=415 bgcolor=#fefefe
| 59415 || 1999 GJ || — || April 4, 1999 || Modra || A. Galád, J. Tóth || NYS || align=right | 1.9 km || 
|-id=416 bgcolor=#fefefe
| 59416 || 1999 GM || — || April 5, 1999 || Višnjan Observatory || K. Korlević || NYS || align=right | 1.8 km || 
|-id=417 bgcolor=#fefefe
| 59417 Giocasilli ||  ||  || April 5, 1999 || San Marcello || A. Boattini, L. Tesi || V || align=right | 1.9 km || 
|-id=418 bgcolor=#E9E9E9
| 59418 ||  || — || April 7, 1999 || Oizumi || T. Kobayashi || — || align=right | 2.7 km || 
|-id=419 bgcolor=#E9E9E9
| 59419 Prešov ||  ||  || April 9, 1999 || Modra || L. Kornoš, Š. Gajdoš || — || align=right | 2.6 km || 
|-id=420 bgcolor=#fefefe
| 59420 ||  || — || April 9, 1999 || Oaxaca || J. M. Roe || NYS || align=right | 5.7 km || 
|-id=421 bgcolor=#d6d6d6
| 59421 ||  || — || April 5, 1999 || San Marcello || G. D'Abramo, A. Boattini || — || align=right | 4.8 km || 
|-id=422 bgcolor=#fefefe
| 59422 ||  || — || April 12, 1999 || Woomera || F. B. Zoltowski || — || align=right | 4.0 km || 
|-id=423 bgcolor=#E9E9E9
| 59423 ||  || — || April 12, 1999 || Woomera || F. B. Zoltowski || — || align=right | 5.9 km || 
|-id=424 bgcolor=#E9E9E9
| 59424 ||  || — || April 10, 1999 || Višnjan Observatory || K. Korlević || — || align=right | 5.3 km || 
|-id=425 bgcolor=#fefefe
| 59425 Xuyangsheng ||  ||  || April 7, 1999 || Xinglong || SCAP || MAS || align=right | 3.4 km || 
|-id=426 bgcolor=#fefefe
| 59426 ||  || — || April 15, 1999 || Fountain Hills || C. W. Juels || NYS || align=right | 5.6 km || 
|-id=427 bgcolor=#fefefe
| 59427 ||  || — || April 14, 1999 || Xinglong || SCAP || — || align=right | 2.4 km || 
|-id=428 bgcolor=#fefefe
| 59428 ||  || — || April 7, 1999 || Anderson Mesa || LONEOS || NYS || align=right | 1.5 km || 
|-id=429 bgcolor=#E9E9E9
| 59429 ||  || — || April 9, 1999 || Anderson Mesa || LONEOS || — || align=right | 2.4 km || 
|-id=430 bgcolor=#d6d6d6
| 59430 ||  || — || April 12, 1999 || Kitt Peak || Spacewatch || — || align=right | 8.7 km || 
|-id=431 bgcolor=#E9E9E9
| 59431 ||  || — || April 12, 1999 || Kitt Peak || Spacewatch || — || align=right | 2.0 km || 
|-id=432 bgcolor=#E9E9E9
| 59432 ||  || — || April 14, 1999 || Kitt Peak || Spacewatch || — || align=right | 4.6 km || 
|-id=433 bgcolor=#fefefe
| 59433 ||  || — || April 15, 1999 || Socorro || LINEAR || — || align=right | 2.2 km || 
|-id=434 bgcolor=#E9E9E9
| 59434 ||  || — || April 15, 1999 || Socorro || LINEAR || — || align=right | 6.7 km || 
|-id=435 bgcolor=#E9E9E9
| 59435 ||  || — || April 15, 1999 || Socorro || LINEAR || RAF || align=right | 2.9 km || 
|-id=436 bgcolor=#fefefe
| 59436 ||  || — || April 15, 1999 || Socorro || LINEAR || CIM || align=right | 6.7 km || 
|-id=437 bgcolor=#E9E9E9
| 59437 ||  || — || April 7, 1999 || Socorro || LINEAR || — || align=right | 4.7 km || 
|-id=438 bgcolor=#E9E9E9
| 59438 ||  || — || April 7, 1999 || Socorro || LINEAR || — || align=right | 2.5 km || 
|-id=439 bgcolor=#E9E9E9
| 59439 ||  || — || April 6, 1999 || Socorro || LINEAR || EUN || align=right | 4.3 km || 
|-id=440 bgcolor=#fefefe
| 59440 ||  || — || April 6, 1999 || Socorro || LINEAR || NYS || align=right | 1.6 km || 
|-id=441 bgcolor=#fefefe
| 59441 ||  || — || April 7, 1999 || Socorro || LINEAR || — || align=right | 2.9 km || 
|-id=442 bgcolor=#fefefe
| 59442 ||  || — || April 7, 1999 || Socorro || LINEAR || NYS || align=right | 2.1 km || 
|-id=443 bgcolor=#E9E9E9
| 59443 ||  || — || April 7, 1999 || Socorro || LINEAR || EUN || align=right | 3.0 km || 
|-id=444 bgcolor=#fefefe
| 59444 ||  || — || April 7, 1999 || Socorro || LINEAR || FLO || align=right | 1.5 km || 
|-id=445 bgcolor=#E9E9E9
| 59445 ||  || — || April 7, 1999 || Socorro || LINEAR || — || align=right | 3.9 km || 
|-id=446 bgcolor=#fefefe
| 59446 ||  || — || April 7, 1999 || Socorro || LINEAR || NYS || align=right | 1.7 km || 
|-id=447 bgcolor=#fefefe
| 59447 ||  || — || April 10, 1999 || Socorro || LINEAR || — || align=right | 2.5 km || 
|-id=448 bgcolor=#fefefe
| 59448 ||  || — || April 12, 1999 || Socorro || LINEAR || V || align=right | 2.3 km || 
|-id=449 bgcolor=#E9E9E9
| 59449 ||  || — || April 12, 1999 || Socorro || LINEAR || — || align=right | 3.6 km || 
|-id=450 bgcolor=#fefefe
| 59450 ||  || — || April 12, 1999 || Socorro || LINEAR || — || align=right | 2.0 km || 
|-id=451 bgcolor=#E9E9E9
| 59451 ||  || — || April 12, 1999 || Socorro || LINEAR || — || align=right | 6.3 km || 
|-id=452 bgcolor=#d6d6d6
| 59452 ||  || — || April 6, 1999 || Socorro || LINEAR || HYG || align=right | 9.4 km || 
|-id=453 bgcolor=#E9E9E9
| 59453 ||  || — || April 7, 1999 || Socorro || LINEAR || — || align=right | 2.7 km || 
|-id=454 bgcolor=#fefefe
| 59454 ||  || — || April 7, 1999 || Socorro || LINEAR || — || align=right | 2.2 km || 
|-id=455 bgcolor=#fefefe
| 59455 ||  || — || April 7, 1999 || Socorro || LINEAR || NYS || align=right | 2.9 km || 
|-id=456 bgcolor=#fefefe
| 59456 ||  || — || April 12, 1999 || Socorro || LINEAR || — || align=right | 1.9 km || 
|-id=457 bgcolor=#E9E9E9
| 59457 ||  || — || April 12, 1999 || Socorro || LINEAR || — || align=right | 4.2 km || 
|-id=458 bgcolor=#fefefe
| 59458 ||  || — || April 12, 1999 || Socorro || LINEAR || — || align=right | 2.2 km || 
|-id=459 bgcolor=#d6d6d6
| 59459 ||  || — || April 12, 1999 || Socorro || LINEAR || EOS || align=right | 5.8 km || 
|-id=460 bgcolor=#fefefe
| 59460 ||  || — || April 12, 1999 || Socorro || LINEAR || — || align=right | 2.1 km || 
|-id=461 bgcolor=#E9E9E9
| 59461 ||  || — || April 12, 1999 || Socorro || LINEAR || MAR || align=right | 3.9 km || 
|-id=462 bgcolor=#E9E9E9
| 59462 ||  || — || April 12, 1999 || Socorro || LINEAR || — || align=right | 3.6 km || 
|-id=463 bgcolor=#E9E9E9
| 59463 ||  || — || April 12, 1999 || Socorro || LINEAR || — || align=right | 10 km || 
|-id=464 bgcolor=#fefefe
| 59464 ||  || — || April 10, 1999 || Anderson Mesa || LONEOS || — || align=right | 2.4 km || 
|-id=465 bgcolor=#d6d6d6
| 59465 ||  || — || April 11, 1999 || Anderson Mesa || LONEOS || — || align=right | 8.2 km || 
|-id=466 bgcolor=#fefefe
| 59466 ||  || — || April 13, 1999 || Xinglong || SCAP || MAS || align=right | 1.4 km || 
|-id=467 bgcolor=#d6d6d6
| 59467 ||  || — || April 6, 1999 || Socorro || LINEAR || — || align=right | 5.8 km || 
|-id=468 bgcolor=#E9E9E9
| 59468 ||  || — || April 15, 1999 || Socorro || LINEAR || — || align=right | 4.1 km || 
|-id=469 bgcolor=#E9E9E9
| 59469 ||  || — || April 15, 1999 || Socorro || LINEAR || — || align=right | 2.9 km || 
|-id=470 bgcolor=#E9E9E9
| 59470 Paveltoufar || 1999 HM ||  || April 17, 1999 || Ondřejov || P. Pravec || — || align=right | 2.4 km || 
|-id=471 bgcolor=#E9E9E9
| 59471 || 1999 HP || — || April 17, 1999 || Woomera || F. B. Zoltowski || — || align=right | 2.0 km || 
|-id=472 bgcolor=#E9E9E9
| 59472 || 1999 HX || — || April 19, 1999 || Reedy Creek || J. Broughton || — || align=right | 6.5 km || 
|-id=473 bgcolor=#E9E9E9
| 59473 ||  || — || April 19, 1999 || Višnjan Observatory || Višnjan Obs. || — || align=right | 5.4 km || 
|-id=474 bgcolor=#E9E9E9
| 59474 ||  || — || April 20, 1999 || Višnjan Observatory || K. Korlević, M. Jurić || — || align=right | 5.8 km || 
|-id=475 bgcolor=#fefefe
| 59475 ||  || — || April 19, 1999 || Višnjan Observatory || K. Korlević, M. Jurić || — || align=right | 4.1 km || 
|-id=476 bgcolor=#fefefe
| 59476 ||  || — || April 21, 1999 || Hawker || J. B. Child || — || align=right | 2.2 km || 
|-id=477 bgcolor=#d6d6d6
| 59477 ||  || — || April 18, 1999 || Catalina || CSS || EMA || align=right | 9.2 km || 
|-id=478 bgcolor=#E9E9E9
| 59478 ||  || — || April 16, 1999 || Kitt Peak || Spacewatch || VIB || align=right | 6.3 km || 
|-id=479 bgcolor=#E9E9E9
| 59479 ||  || — || April 17, 1999 || Kitt Peak || Spacewatch || — || align=right | 4.0 km || 
|-id=480 bgcolor=#d6d6d6
| 59480 ||  || — || April 19, 1999 || Kitt Peak || Spacewatch || EOS || align=right | 5.9 km || 
|-id=481 bgcolor=#E9E9E9
| 59481 ||  || — || April 17, 1999 || Socorro || LINEAR || — || align=right | 4.3 km || 
|-id=482 bgcolor=#E9E9E9
| 59482 ||  || — || April 17, 1999 || Socorro || LINEAR || DOR || align=right | 5.4 km || 
|-id=483 bgcolor=#E9E9E9
| 59483 ||  || — || April 16, 1999 || Catalina || CSS || JUN || align=right | 7.1 km || 
|-id=484 bgcolor=#fefefe
| 59484 || 1999 JJ || — || May 6, 1999 || Socorro || LINEAR || H || align=right | 1.9 km || 
|-id=485 bgcolor=#E9E9E9
| 59485 || 1999 JR || — || May 4, 1999 || Xinglong || SCAP || — || align=right | 4.1 km || 
|-id=486 bgcolor=#E9E9E9
| 59486 || 1999 JV || — || May 5, 1999 || Xinglong || SCAP || — || align=right | 2.8 km || 
|-id=487 bgcolor=#E9E9E9
| 59487 ||  || — || May 8, 1999 || Catalina || CSS || — || align=right | 4.3 km || 
|-id=488 bgcolor=#E9E9E9
| 59488 ||  || — || May 8, 1999 || Catalina || CSS || — || align=right | 7.0 km || 
|-id=489 bgcolor=#fefefe
| 59489 ||  || — || May 8, 1999 || Catalina || CSS || V || align=right | 3.4 km || 
|-id=490 bgcolor=#FA8072
| 59490 ||  || — || May 10, 1999 || Socorro || LINEAR || PHO || align=right | 3.3 km || 
|-id=491 bgcolor=#fefefe
| 59491 ||  || — || May 10, 1999 || Socorro || LINEAR || — || align=right | 2.8 km || 
|-id=492 bgcolor=#E9E9E9
| 59492 ||  || — || May 10, 1999 || Socorro || LINEAR || — || align=right | 4.1 km || 
|-id=493 bgcolor=#fefefe
| 59493 ||  || — || May 10, 1999 || Socorro || LINEAR || H || align=right | 2.7 km || 
|-id=494 bgcolor=#E9E9E9
| 59494 ||  || — || May 10, 1999 || Socorro || LINEAR || — || align=right | 4.0 km || 
|-id=495 bgcolor=#E9E9E9
| 59495 ||  || — || May 6, 1999 || Majorca || Á. López J., R. Pacheco || — || align=right | 4.1 km || 
|-id=496 bgcolor=#fefefe
| 59496 ||  || — || May 8, 1999 || Catalina || CSS || — || align=right | 2.3 km || 
|-id=497 bgcolor=#E9E9E9
| 59497 ||  || — || May 8, 1999 || Catalina || CSS || — || align=right | 3.7 km || 
|-id=498 bgcolor=#fefefe
| 59498 ||  || — || May 12, 1999 || Socorro || LINEAR || — || align=right | 3.6 km || 
|-id=499 bgcolor=#E9E9E9
| 59499 ||  || — || May 14, 1999 || Catalina || CSS || — || align=right | 6.7 km || 
|-id=500 bgcolor=#E9E9E9
| 59500 ||  || — || May 14, 1999 || Reedy Creek || J. Broughton || — || align=right | 2.1 km || 
|}

59501–59600 

|-bgcolor=#E9E9E9
| 59501 ||  || — || May 7, 1999 || Catalina || CSS || — || align=right | 7.0 km || 
|-id=502 bgcolor=#E9E9E9
| 59502 ||  || — || May 8, 1999 || Catalina || CSS || — || align=right | 2.6 km || 
|-id=503 bgcolor=#E9E9E9
| 59503 ||  || — || May 8, 1999 || Catalina || CSS || — || align=right | 3.1 km || 
|-id=504 bgcolor=#d6d6d6
| 59504 ||  || — || May 8, 1999 || Catalina || CSS || EOS || align=right | 5.4 km || 
|-id=505 bgcolor=#E9E9E9
| 59505 ||  || — || May 9, 1999 || Catalina || CSS || — || align=right | 7.1 km || 
|-id=506 bgcolor=#E9E9E9
| 59506 ||  || — || May 9, 1999 || Višnjan Observatory || K. Korlević || — || align=right | 4.4 km || 
|-id=507 bgcolor=#E9E9E9
| 59507 ||  || — || May 14, 1999 || Catalina || CSS || MAR || align=right | 4.2 km || 
|-id=508 bgcolor=#fefefe
| 59508 ||  || — || May 10, 1999 || Socorro || LINEAR || — || align=right | 2.6 km || 
|-id=509 bgcolor=#E9E9E9
| 59509 ||  || — || May 10, 1999 || Socorro || LINEAR || EUN || align=right | 2.5 km || 
|-id=510 bgcolor=#E9E9E9
| 59510 ||  || — || May 10, 1999 || Socorro || LINEAR || BRU || align=right | 6.4 km || 
|-id=511 bgcolor=#E9E9E9
| 59511 ||  || — || May 10, 1999 || Socorro || LINEAR || — || align=right | 5.6 km || 
|-id=512 bgcolor=#E9E9E9
| 59512 ||  || — || May 10, 1999 || Socorro || LINEAR || MAR || align=right | 2.8 km || 
|-id=513 bgcolor=#E9E9E9
| 59513 ||  || — || May 10, 1999 || Socorro || LINEAR || WIT || align=right | 3.1 km || 
|-id=514 bgcolor=#fefefe
| 59514 ||  || — || May 12, 1999 || Socorro || LINEAR || — || align=right | 2.0 km || 
|-id=515 bgcolor=#E9E9E9
| 59515 ||  || — || May 15, 1999 || Catalina || CSS || — || align=right | 6.2 km || 
|-id=516 bgcolor=#E9E9E9
| 59516 ||  || — || May 10, 1999 || Socorro || LINEAR || — || align=right | 3.8 km || 
|-id=517 bgcolor=#E9E9E9
| 59517 ||  || — || May 15, 1999 || Kitt Peak || Spacewatch || — || align=right | 4.3 km || 
|-id=518 bgcolor=#fefefe
| 59518 ||  || — || May 10, 1999 || Socorro || LINEAR || — || align=right | 7.2 km || 
|-id=519 bgcolor=#E9E9E9
| 59519 ||  || — || May 10, 1999 || Socorro || LINEAR || — || align=right | 2.2 km || 
|-id=520 bgcolor=#fefefe
| 59520 ||  || — || May 10, 1999 || Socorro || LINEAR || — || align=right | 2.5 km || 
|-id=521 bgcolor=#fefefe
| 59521 ||  || — || May 10, 1999 || Socorro || LINEAR || — || align=right | 2.4 km || 
|-id=522 bgcolor=#fefefe
| 59522 ||  || — || May 10, 1999 || Socorro || LINEAR || V || align=right | 3.7 km || 
|-id=523 bgcolor=#E9E9E9
| 59523 ||  || — || May 10, 1999 || Socorro || LINEAR || — || align=right | 4.8 km || 
|-id=524 bgcolor=#E9E9E9
| 59524 ||  || — || May 10, 1999 || Socorro || LINEAR || — || align=right | 3.4 km || 
|-id=525 bgcolor=#d6d6d6
| 59525 ||  || — || May 10, 1999 || Socorro || LINEAR || — || align=right | 11 km || 
|-id=526 bgcolor=#E9E9E9
| 59526 ||  || — || May 10, 1999 || Socorro || LINEAR || — || align=right | 7.7 km || 
|-id=527 bgcolor=#E9E9E9
| 59527 ||  || — || May 10, 1999 || Socorro || LINEAR || EUN || align=right | 4.9 km || 
|-id=528 bgcolor=#E9E9E9
| 59528 ||  || — || May 10, 1999 || Socorro || LINEAR || GEF || align=right | 4.0 km || 
|-id=529 bgcolor=#E9E9E9
| 59529 ||  || — || May 10, 1999 || Socorro || LINEAR || — || align=right | 7.0 km || 
|-id=530 bgcolor=#d6d6d6
| 59530 ||  || — || May 10, 1999 || Socorro || LINEAR || — || align=right | 8.2 km || 
|-id=531 bgcolor=#E9E9E9
| 59531 ||  || — || May 10, 1999 || Socorro || LINEAR || RAF || align=right | 3.6 km || 
|-id=532 bgcolor=#E9E9E9
| 59532 ||  || — || May 10, 1999 || Socorro || LINEAR || MAR || align=right | 2.3 km || 
|-id=533 bgcolor=#E9E9E9
| 59533 ||  || — || May 10, 1999 || Socorro || LINEAR || — || align=right | 2.6 km || 
|-id=534 bgcolor=#fefefe
| 59534 ||  || — || May 10, 1999 || Socorro || LINEAR || MAS || align=right | 3.3 km || 
|-id=535 bgcolor=#E9E9E9
| 59535 ||  || — || May 10, 1999 || Socorro || LINEAR || MAR || align=right | 4.3 km || 
|-id=536 bgcolor=#E9E9E9
| 59536 ||  || — || May 10, 1999 || Socorro || LINEAR || — || align=right | 4.2 km || 
|-id=537 bgcolor=#fefefe
| 59537 ||  || — || May 10, 1999 || Socorro || LINEAR || FLO || align=right | 2.1 km || 
|-id=538 bgcolor=#E9E9E9
| 59538 ||  || — || May 10, 1999 || Socorro || LINEAR || — || align=right | 3.4 km || 
|-id=539 bgcolor=#E9E9E9
| 59539 ||  || — || May 10, 1999 || Socorro || LINEAR || — || align=right | 3.0 km || 
|-id=540 bgcolor=#fefefe
| 59540 ||  || — || May 10, 1999 || Socorro || LINEAR || — || align=right | 2.5 km || 
|-id=541 bgcolor=#E9E9E9
| 59541 ||  || — || May 10, 1999 || Socorro || LINEAR || — || align=right | 3.3 km || 
|-id=542 bgcolor=#E9E9E9
| 59542 ||  || — || May 10, 1999 || Socorro || LINEAR || — || align=right | 7.4 km || 
|-id=543 bgcolor=#E9E9E9
| 59543 ||  || — || May 10, 1999 || Socorro || LINEAR || — || align=right | 2.6 km || 
|-id=544 bgcolor=#E9E9E9
| 59544 ||  || — || May 10, 1999 || Socorro || LINEAR || KON || align=right | 7.5 km || 
|-id=545 bgcolor=#E9E9E9
| 59545 ||  || — || May 10, 1999 || Socorro || LINEAR || — || align=right | 2.9 km || 
|-id=546 bgcolor=#fefefe
| 59546 ||  || — || May 10, 1999 || Socorro || LINEAR || — || align=right | 3.2 km || 
|-id=547 bgcolor=#E9E9E9
| 59547 ||  || — || May 10, 1999 || Socorro || LINEAR || RAF || align=right | 2.8 km || 
|-id=548 bgcolor=#E9E9E9
| 59548 ||  || — || May 10, 1999 || Socorro || LINEAR || MAR || align=right | 2.6 km || 
|-id=549 bgcolor=#E9E9E9
| 59549 ||  || — || May 10, 1999 || Socorro || LINEAR || — || align=right | 5.2 km || 
|-id=550 bgcolor=#E9E9E9
| 59550 ||  || — || May 10, 1999 || Socorro || LINEAR || — || align=right | 3.9 km || 
|-id=551 bgcolor=#E9E9E9
| 59551 ||  || — || May 10, 1999 || Socorro || LINEAR || EUN || align=right | 4.2 km || 
|-id=552 bgcolor=#E9E9E9
| 59552 ||  || — || May 10, 1999 || Socorro || LINEAR || — || align=right | 3.6 km || 
|-id=553 bgcolor=#E9E9E9
| 59553 ||  || — || May 10, 1999 || Socorro || LINEAR || — || align=right | 2.5 km || 
|-id=554 bgcolor=#E9E9E9
| 59554 ||  || — || May 10, 1999 || Socorro || LINEAR || EUN || align=right | 2.6 km || 
|-id=555 bgcolor=#E9E9E9
| 59555 ||  || — || May 10, 1999 || Socorro || LINEAR || — || align=right | 2.7 km || 
|-id=556 bgcolor=#E9E9E9
| 59556 ||  || — || May 10, 1999 || Socorro || LINEAR || — || align=right | 3.3 km || 
|-id=557 bgcolor=#E9E9E9
| 59557 ||  || — || May 10, 1999 || Socorro || LINEAR || — || align=right | 3.3 km || 
|-id=558 bgcolor=#E9E9E9
| 59558 ||  || — || May 10, 1999 || Socorro || LINEAR || — || align=right | 4.4 km || 
|-id=559 bgcolor=#E9E9E9
| 59559 ||  || — || May 10, 1999 || Socorro || LINEAR || — || align=right | 2.2 km || 
|-id=560 bgcolor=#d6d6d6
| 59560 ||  || — || May 10, 1999 || Socorro || LINEAR || — || align=right | 6.2 km || 
|-id=561 bgcolor=#E9E9E9
| 59561 ||  || — || May 10, 1999 || Socorro || LINEAR || — || align=right | 1.6 km || 
|-id=562 bgcolor=#E9E9E9
| 59562 ||  || — || May 10, 1999 || Socorro || LINEAR || — || align=right | 4.1 km || 
|-id=563 bgcolor=#E9E9E9
| 59563 ||  || — || May 10, 1999 || Socorro || LINEAR || — || align=right | 2.3 km || 
|-id=564 bgcolor=#fefefe
| 59564 ||  || — || May 10, 1999 || Socorro || LINEAR || — || align=right | 3.1 km || 
|-id=565 bgcolor=#E9E9E9
| 59565 ||  || — || May 10, 1999 || Socorro || LINEAR || — || align=right | 3.3 km || 
|-id=566 bgcolor=#E9E9E9
| 59566 ||  || — || May 10, 1999 || Socorro || LINEAR || — || align=right | 2.5 km || 
|-id=567 bgcolor=#E9E9E9
| 59567 ||  || — || May 10, 1999 || Socorro || LINEAR || — || align=right | 2.1 km || 
|-id=568 bgcolor=#E9E9E9
| 59568 ||  || — || May 10, 1999 || Socorro || LINEAR || — || align=right | 5.5 km || 
|-id=569 bgcolor=#fefefe
| 59569 ||  || — || May 10, 1999 || Socorro || LINEAR || V || align=right | 2.9 km || 
|-id=570 bgcolor=#E9E9E9
| 59570 ||  || — || May 10, 1999 || Socorro || LINEAR || — || align=right | 4.2 km || 
|-id=571 bgcolor=#E9E9E9
| 59571 ||  || — || May 10, 1999 || Socorro || LINEAR || — || align=right | 5.9 km || 
|-id=572 bgcolor=#E9E9E9
| 59572 ||  || — || May 10, 1999 || Socorro || LINEAR || — || align=right | 2.9 km || 
|-id=573 bgcolor=#E9E9E9
| 59573 ||  || — || May 10, 1999 || Socorro || LINEAR || — || align=right | 3.3 km || 
|-id=574 bgcolor=#E9E9E9
| 59574 ||  || — || May 10, 1999 || Socorro || LINEAR || NEM || align=right | 6.9 km || 
|-id=575 bgcolor=#E9E9E9
| 59575 ||  || — || May 10, 1999 || Socorro || LINEAR || — || align=right | 4.1 km || 
|-id=576 bgcolor=#E9E9E9
| 59576 ||  || — || May 10, 1999 || Socorro || LINEAR || — || align=right | 3.4 km || 
|-id=577 bgcolor=#fefefe
| 59577 ||  || — || May 10, 1999 || Socorro || LINEAR || — || align=right | 2.6 km || 
|-id=578 bgcolor=#d6d6d6
| 59578 ||  || — || May 10, 1999 || Socorro || LINEAR || — || align=right | 3.9 km || 
|-id=579 bgcolor=#E9E9E9
| 59579 ||  || — || May 10, 1999 || Socorro || LINEAR || — || align=right | 6.3 km || 
|-id=580 bgcolor=#E9E9E9
| 59580 ||  || — || May 10, 1999 || Socorro || LINEAR || — || align=right | 2.1 km || 
|-id=581 bgcolor=#E9E9E9
| 59581 ||  || — || May 10, 1999 || Socorro || LINEAR || EUN || align=right | 3.9 km || 
|-id=582 bgcolor=#E9E9E9
| 59582 ||  || — || May 10, 1999 || Socorro || LINEAR || — || align=right | 6.8 km || 
|-id=583 bgcolor=#E9E9E9
| 59583 ||  || — || May 10, 1999 || Socorro || LINEAR || MIT || align=right | 5.3 km || 
|-id=584 bgcolor=#E9E9E9
| 59584 ||  || — || May 10, 1999 || Socorro || LINEAR || — || align=right | 3.8 km || 
|-id=585 bgcolor=#E9E9E9
| 59585 ||  || — || May 10, 1999 || Socorro || LINEAR || EUN || align=right | 4.9 km || 
|-id=586 bgcolor=#E9E9E9
| 59586 ||  || — || May 10, 1999 || Socorro || LINEAR || — || align=right | 3.3 km || 
|-id=587 bgcolor=#E9E9E9
| 59587 ||  || — || May 10, 1999 || Socorro || LINEAR || — || align=right | 6.8 km || 
|-id=588 bgcolor=#E9E9E9
| 59588 ||  || — || May 10, 1999 || Socorro || LINEAR || — || align=right | 5.4 km || 
|-id=589 bgcolor=#E9E9E9
| 59589 ||  || — || May 10, 1999 || Socorro || LINEAR || — || align=right | 4.6 km || 
|-id=590 bgcolor=#E9E9E9
| 59590 ||  || — || May 10, 1999 || Socorro || LINEAR || — || align=right | 3.2 km || 
|-id=591 bgcolor=#E9E9E9
| 59591 ||  || — || May 10, 1999 || Socorro || LINEAR || — || align=right | 6.4 km || 
|-id=592 bgcolor=#E9E9E9
| 59592 ||  || — || May 10, 1999 || Socorro || LINEAR || — || align=right | 4.9 km || 
|-id=593 bgcolor=#E9E9E9
| 59593 ||  || — || May 10, 1999 || Socorro || LINEAR || — || align=right | 3.6 km || 
|-id=594 bgcolor=#E9E9E9
| 59594 ||  || — || May 10, 1999 || Socorro || LINEAR || GEF || align=right | 3.3 km || 
|-id=595 bgcolor=#fefefe
| 59595 ||  || — || May 10, 1999 || Socorro || LINEAR || FLO || align=right | 3.2 km || 
|-id=596 bgcolor=#E9E9E9
| 59596 ||  || — || May 10, 1999 || Socorro || LINEAR || — || align=right | 6.0 km || 
|-id=597 bgcolor=#fefefe
| 59597 ||  || — || May 10, 1999 || Socorro || LINEAR || FLO || align=right | 2.0 km || 
|-id=598 bgcolor=#E9E9E9
| 59598 ||  || — || May 10, 1999 || Socorro || LINEAR || — || align=right | 2.4 km || 
|-id=599 bgcolor=#E9E9E9
| 59599 ||  || — || May 10, 1999 || Socorro || LINEAR || MAR || align=right | 4.3 km || 
|-id=600 bgcolor=#E9E9E9
| 59600 ||  || — || May 10, 1999 || Socorro || LINEAR || PAD || align=right | 5.4 km || 
|}

59601–59700 

|-bgcolor=#fefefe
| 59601 ||  || — || May 10, 1999 || Socorro || LINEAR || — || align=right | 1.6 km || 
|-id=602 bgcolor=#E9E9E9
| 59602 ||  || — || May 10, 1999 || Socorro || LINEAR || — || align=right | 7.3 km || 
|-id=603 bgcolor=#E9E9E9
| 59603 ||  || — || May 10, 1999 || Socorro || LINEAR || WIT || align=right | 4.1 km || 
|-id=604 bgcolor=#E9E9E9
| 59604 ||  || — || May 10, 1999 || Socorro || LINEAR || EUN || align=right | 2.5 km || 
|-id=605 bgcolor=#fefefe
| 59605 ||  || — || May 10, 1999 || Socorro || LINEAR || — || align=right | 2.7 km || 
|-id=606 bgcolor=#fefefe
| 59606 ||  || — || May 12, 1999 || Socorro || LINEAR || — || align=right | 2.5 km || 
|-id=607 bgcolor=#fefefe
| 59607 ||  || — || May 12, 1999 || Socorro || LINEAR || — || align=right | 4.0 km || 
|-id=608 bgcolor=#E9E9E9
| 59608 ||  || — || May 12, 1999 || Socorro || LINEAR || — || align=right | 3.2 km || 
|-id=609 bgcolor=#E9E9E9
| 59609 ||  || — || May 12, 1999 || Socorro || LINEAR || — || align=right | 2.4 km || 
|-id=610 bgcolor=#E9E9E9
| 59610 ||  || — || May 12, 1999 || Socorro || LINEAR || — || align=right | 2.4 km || 
|-id=611 bgcolor=#E9E9E9
| 59611 ||  || — || May 12, 1999 || Socorro || LINEAR || EUN || align=right | 2.8 km || 
|-id=612 bgcolor=#fefefe
| 59612 ||  || — || May 12, 1999 || Socorro || LINEAR || — || align=right | 2.4 km || 
|-id=613 bgcolor=#fefefe
| 59613 ||  || — || May 12, 1999 || Socorro || LINEAR || — || align=right | 2.7 km || 
|-id=614 bgcolor=#E9E9E9
| 59614 ||  || — || May 12, 1999 || Socorro || LINEAR || — || align=right | 5.3 km || 
|-id=615 bgcolor=#E9E9E9
| 59615 ||  || — || May 12, 1999 || Socorro || LINEAR || — || align=right | 3.1 km || 
|-id=616 bgcolor=#E9E9E9
| 59616 ||  || — || May 12, 1999 || Socorro || LINEAR || EUN || align=right | 4.1 km || 
|-id=617 bgcolor=#E9E9E9
| 59617 ||  || — || May 12, 1999 || Socorro || LINEAR || — || align=right | 2.3 km || 
|-id=618 bgcolor=#E9E9E9
| 59618 ||  || — || May 12, 1999 || Socorro || LINEAR || — || align=right | 2.4 km || 
|-id=619 bgcolor=#E9E9E9
| 59619 ||  || — || May 12, 1999 || Socorro || LINEAR || — || align=right | 2.2 km || 
|-id=620 bgcolor=#fefefe
| 59620 ||  || — || May 12, 1999 || Socorro || LINEAR || — || align=right | 1.7 km || 
|-id=621 bgcolor=#E9E9E9
| 59621 ||  || — || May 12, 1999 || Socorro || LINEAR || — || align=right | 6.6 km || 
|-id=622 bgcolor=#E9E9E9
| 59622 ||  || — || May 12, 1999 || Socorro || LINEAR || — || align=right | 7.5 km || 
|-id=623 bgcolor=#E9E9E9
| 59623 ||  || — || May 12, 1999 || Socorro || LINEAR || — || align=right | 5.7 km || 
|-id=624 bgcolor=#E9E9E9
| 59624 ||  || — || May 12, 1999 || Socorro || LINEAR || EUN || align=right | 3.3 km || 
|-id=625 bgcolor=#E9E9E9
| 59625 ||  || — || May 12, 1999 || Socorro || LINEAR || — || align=right | 6.4 km || 
|-id=626 bgcolor=#fefefe
| 59626 ||  || — || May 12, 1999 || Socorro || LINEAR || — || align=right | 5.6 km || 
|-id=627 bgcolor=#E9E9E9
| 59627 ||  || — || May 10, 1999 || Socorro || LINEAR || — || align=right | 3.8 km || 
|-id=628 bgcolor=#E9E9E9
| 59628 ||  || — || May 10, 1999 || Socorro || LINEAR || — || align=right | 5.4 km || 
|-id=629 bgcolor=#E9E9E9
| 59629 ||  || — || May 10, 1999 || Socorro || LINEAR || MAR || align=right | 4.9 km || 
|-id=630 bgcolor=#E9E9E9
| 59630 ||  || — || May 12, 1999 || Socorro || LINEAR || — || align=right | 4.1 km || 
|-id=631 bgcolor=#fefefe
| 59631 ||  || — || May 12, 1999 || Socorro || LINEAR || V || align=right | 2.1 km || 
|-id=632 bgcolor=#E9E9E9
| 59632 ||  || — || May 12, 1999 || Socorro || LINEAR || — || align=right | 8.1 km || 
|-id=633 bgcolor=#E9E9E9
| 59633 ||  || — || May 12, 1999 || Socorro || LINEAR || EUN || align=right | 5.7 km || 
|-id=634 bgcolor=#E9E9E9
| 59634 ||  || — || May 13, 1999 || Socorro || LINEAR || — || align=right | 2.8 km || 
|-id=635 bgcolor=#E9E9E9
| 59635 ||  || — || May 12, 1999 || Socorro || LINEAR || — || align=right | 5.4 km || 
|-id=636 bgcolor=#fefefe
| 59636 ||  || — || May 14, 1999 || Socorro || LINEAR || — || align=right | 2.7 km || 
|-id=637 bgcolor=#d6d6d6
| 59637 ||  || — || May 12, 1999 || Socorro || LINEAR || — || align=right | 9.1 km || 
|-id=638 bgcolor=#E9E9E9
| 59638 ||  || — || May 12, 1999 || Socorro || LINEAR || EUN || align=right | 4.4 km || 
|-id=639 bgcolor=#E9E9E9
| 59639 ||  || — || May 12, 1999 || Socorro || LINEAR || — || align=right | 3.2 km || 
|-id=640 bgcolor=#E9E9E9
| 59640 ||  || — || May 12, 1999 || Socorro || LINEAR || MAR || align=right | 3.1 km || 
|-id=641 bgcolor=#fefefe
| 59641 ||  || — || May 10, 1999 || Socorro || LINEAR || FLO || align=right | 1.9 km || 
|-id=642 bgcolor=#E9E9E9
| 59642 ||  || — || May 12, 1999 || Socorro || LINEAR || — || align=right | 3.5 km || 
|-id=643 bgcolor=#E9E9E9
| 59643 ||  || — || May 12, 1999 || Socorro || LINEAR || — || align=right | 3.2 km || 
|-id=644 bgcolor=#fefefe
| 59644 ||  || — || May 12, 1999 || Socorro || LINEAR || — || align=right | 2.6 km || 
|-id=645 bgcolor=#E9E9E9
| 59645 ||  || — || May 12, 1999 || Socorro || LINEAR || GEF || align=right | 2.9 km || 
|-id=646 bgcolor=#E9E9E9
| 59646 ||  || — || May 12, 1999 || Socorro || LINEAR || EUN || align=right | 3.5 km || 
|-id=647 bgcolor=#E9E9E9
| 59647 ||  || — || May 12, 1999 || Socorro || LINEAR || — || align=right | 2.9 km || 
|-id=648 bgcolor=#E9E9E9
| 59648 ||  || — || May 12, 1999 || Socorro || LINEAR || — || align=right | 4.5 km || 
|-id=649 bgcolor=#fefefe
| 59649 ||  || — || May 12, 1999 || Socorro || LINEAR || — || align=right | 2.0 km || 
|-id=650 bgcolor=#E9E9E9
| 59650 ||  || — || May 12, 1999 || Socorro || LINEAR || — || align=right | 5.5 km || 
|-id=651 bgcolor=#d6d6d6
| 59651 ||  || — || May 12, 1999 || Socorro || LINEAR || — || align=right | 13 km || 
|-id=652 bgcolor=#E9E9E9
| 59652 ||  || — || May 12, 1999 || Socorro || LINEAR || — || align=right | 4.3 km || 
|-id=653 bgcolor=#E9E9E9
| 59653 ||  || — || May 12, 1999 || Socorro || LINEAR || — || align=right | 4.0 km || 
|-id=654 bgcolor=#E9E9E9
| 59654 ||  || — || May 12, 1999 || Socorro || LINEAR || RAF || align=right | 3.2 km || 
|-id=655 bgcolor=#E9E9E9
| 59655 ||  || — || May 12, 1999 || Socorro || LINEAR || — || align=right | 3.3 km || 
|-id=656 bgcolor=#fefefe
| 59656 ||  || — || May 12, 1999 || Socorro || LINEAR || — || align=right | 3.4 km || 
|-id=657 bgcolor=#E9E9E9
| 59657 ||  || — || May 12, 1999 || Socorro || LINEAR || — || align=right | 7.1 km || 
|-id=658 bgcolor=#E9E9E9
| 59658 ||  || — || May 12, 1999 || Socorro || LINEAR || — || align=right | 3.6 km || 
|-id=659 bgcolor=#E9E9E9
| 59659 ||  || — || May 12, 1999 || Socorro || LINEAR || — || align=right | 5.4 km || 
|-id=660 bgcolor=#E9E9E9
| 59660 ||  || — || May 12, 1999 || Socorro || LINEAR || — || align=right | 2.8 km || 
|-id=661 bgcolor=#E9E9E9
| 59661 ||  || — || May 12, 1999 || Socorro || LINEAR || — || align=right | 7.1 km || 
|-id=662 bgcolor=#E9E9E9
| 59662 ||  || — || May 12, 1999 || Socorro || LINEAR || EUN || align=right | 3.7 km || 
|-id=663 bgcolor=#d6d6d6
| 59663 ||  || — || May 12, 1999 || Socorro || LINEAR || — || align=right | 9.1 km || 
|-id=664 bgcolor=#E9E9E9
| 59664 ||  || — || May 12, 1999 || Socorro || LINEAR || — || align=right | 4.1 km || 
|-id=665 bgcolor=#E9E9E9
| 59665 ||  || — || May 12, 1999 || Socorro || LINEAR || EUN || align=right | 4.0 km || 
|-id=666 bgcolor=#E9E9E9
| 59666 ||  || — || May 12, 1999 || Socorro || LINEAR || — || align=right | 3.8 km || 
|-id=667 bgcolor=#E9E9E9
| 59667 ||  || — || May 12, 1999 || Socorro || LINEAR || EUN || align=right | 3.6 km || 
|-id=668 bgcolor=#d6d6d6
| 59668 ||  || — || May 12, 1999 || Socorro || LINEAR || — || align=right | 8.0 km || 
|-id=669 bgcolor=#E9E9E9
| 59669 ||  || — || May 12, 1999 || Socorro || LINEAR || ADE || align=right | 6.2 km || 
|-id=670 bgcolor=#E9E9E9
| 59670 ||  || — || May 12, 1999 || Socorro || LINEAR || — || align=right | 4.3 km || 
|-id=671 bgcolor=#E9E9E9
| 59671 ||  || — || May 12, 1999 || Socorro || LINEAR || — || align=right | 3.7 km || 
|-id=672 bgcolor=#E9E9E9
| 59672 ||  || — || May 12, 1999 || Socorro || LINEAR || — || align=right | 4.3 km || 
|-id=673 bgcolor=#E9E9E9
| 59673 ||  || — || May 12, 1999 || Socorro || LINEAR || — || align=right | 3.2 km || 
|-id=674 bgcolor=#E9E9E9
| 59674 ||  || — || May 12, 1999 || Socorro || LINEAR || MAR || align=right | 3.2 km || 
|-id=675 bgcolor=#E9E9E9
| 59675 ||  || — || May 12, 1999 || Socorro || LINEAR || — || align=right | 3.6 km || 
|-id=676 bgcolor=#E9E9E9
| 59676 ||  || — || May 12, 1999 || Socorro || LINEAR || — || align=right | 11 km || 
|-id=677 bgcolor=#E9E9E9
| 59677 ||  || — || May 12, 1999 || Socorro || LINEAR || — || align=right | 4.1 km || 
|-id=678 bgcolor=#d6d6d6
| 59678 ||  || — || May 13, 1999 || Socorro || LINEAR || — || align=right | 5.2 km || 
|-id=679 bgcolor=#E9E9E9
| 59679 ||  || — || May 13, 1999 || Socorro || LINEAR || — || align=right | 4.0 km || 
|-id=680 bgcolor=#d6d6d6
| 59680 ||  || — || May 13, 1999 || Socorro || LINEAR || — || align=right | 8.2 km || 
|-id=681 bgcolor=#E9E9E9
| 59681 ||  || — || May 13, 1999 || Socorro || LINEAR || — || align=right | 5.7 km || 
|-id=682 bgcolor=#E9E9E9
| 59682 ||  || — || May 13, 1999 || Socorro || LINEAR || PAD || align=right | 5.1 km || 
|-id=683 bgcolor=#E9E9E9
| 59683 ||  || — || May 15, 1999 || Socorro || LINEAR || EUN || align=right | 4.8 km || 
|-id=684 bgcolor=#E9E9E9
| 59684 ||  || — || May 13, 1999 || Socorro || LINEAR || — || align=right | 4.6 km || 
|-id=685 bgcolor=#E9E9E9
| 59685 ||  || — || May 13, 1999 || Socorro || LINEAR || — || align=right | 3.4 km || 
|-id=686 bgcolor=#fefefe
| 59686 ||  || — || May 13, 1999 || Socorro || LINEAR || V || align=right | 1.8 km || 
|-id=687 bgcolor=#E9E9E9
| 59687 ||  || — || May 13, 1999 || Socorro || LINEAR || — || align=right | 2.3 km || 
|-id=688 bgcolor=#E9E9E9
| 59688 ||  || — || May 13, 1999 || Socorro || LINEAR || — || align=right | 4.6 km || 
|-id=689 bgcolor=#fefefe
| 59689 ||  || — || May 13, 1999 || Socorro || LINEAR || — || align=right | 2.6 km || 
|-id=690 bgcolor=#fefefe
| 59690 ||  || — || May 13, 1999 || Socorro || LINEAR || — || align=right | 2.7 km || 
|-id=691 bgcolor=#E9E9E9
| 59691 ||  || — || May 13, 1999 || Socorro || LINEAR || — || align=right | 4.2 km || 
|-id=692 bgcolor=#fefefe
| 59692 ||  || — || May 13, 1999 || Socorro || LINEAR || NYS || align=right | 3.3 km || 
|-id=693 bgcolor=#E9E9E9
| 59693 ||  || — || May 13, 1999 || Socorro || LINEAR || — || align=right | 3.4 km || 
|-id=694 bgcolor=#fefefe
| 59694 ||  || — || May 13, 1999 || Socorro || LINEAR || — || align=right | 2.1 km || 
|-id=695 bgcolor=#fefefe
| 59695 ||  || — || May 13, 1999 || Socorro || LINEAR || — || align=right | 2.0 km || 
|-id=696 bgcolor=#E9E9E9
| 59696 ||  || — || May 13, 1999 || Socorro || LINEAR || — || align=right | 4.6 km || 
|-id=697 bgcolor=#E9E9E9
| 59697 ||  || — || May 13, 1999 || Socorro || LINEAR || — || align=right | 3.9 km || 
|-id=698 bgcolor=#fefefe
| 59698 ||  || — || May 13, 1999 || Socorro || LINEAR || — || align=right | 2.0 km || 
|-id=699 bgcolor=#E9E9E9
| 59699 ||  || — || May 13, 1999 || Socorro || LINEAR || — || align=right | 2.0 km || 
|-id=700 bgcolor=#E9E9E9
| 59700 ||  || — || May 13, 1999 || Socorro || LINEAR || GEF || align=right | 3.7 km || 
|}

59701–59800 

|-bgcolor=#E9E9E9
| 59701 ||  || — || May 13, 1999 || Socorro || LINEAR || — || align=right | 5.1 km || 
|-id=702 bgcolor=#E9E9E9
| 59702 ||  || — || May 13, 1999 || Socorro || LINEAR || MAR || align=right | 2.2 km || 
|-id=703 bgcolor=#E9E9E9
| 59703 ||  || — || May 13, 1999 || Socorro || LINEAR || — || align=right | 2.4 km || 
|-id=704 bgcolor=#fefefe
| 59704 ||  || — || May 13, 1999 || Socorro || LINEAR || — || align=right | 2.8 km || 
|-id=705 bgcolor=#E9E9E9
| 59705 ||  || — || May 13, 1999 || Socorro || LINEAR || MAR || align=right | 2.5 km || 
|-id=706 bgcolor=#E9E9E9
| 59706 ||  || — || May 13, 1999 || Socorro || LINEAR || RAF || align=right | 3.1 km || 
|-id=707 bgcolor=#E9E9E9
| 59707 ||  || — || May 13, 1999 || Socorro || LINEAR || — || align=right | 6.2 km || 
|-id=708 bgcolor=#fefefe
| 59708 ||  || — || May 13, 1999 || Socorro || LINEAR || V || align=right | 1.9 km || 
|-id=709 bgcolor=#E9E9E9
| 59709 ||  || — || May 13, 1999 || Socorro || LINEAR || — || align=right | 6.6 km || 
|-id=710 bgcolor=#E9E9E9
| 59710 ||  || — || May 14, 1999 || Socorro || LINEAR || — || align=right | 2.3 km || 
|-id=711 bgcolor=#E9E9E9
| 59711 ||  || — || May 13, 1999 || Socorro || LINEAR || EUN || align=right | 2.2 km || 
|-id=712 bgcolor=#E9E9E9
| 59712 ||  || — || May 13, 1999 || Socorro || LINEAR || — || align=right | 2.0 km || 
|-id=713 bgcolor=#E9E9E9
| 59713 ||  || — || May 13, 1999 || Socorro || LINEAR || — || align=right | 3.9 km || 
|-id=714 bgcolor=#E9E9E9
| 59714 ||  || — || May 10, 1999 || Socorro || LINEAR || — || align=right | 3.6 km || 
|-id=715 bgcolor=#E9E9E9
| 59715 ||  || — || May 12, 1999 || Socorro || LINEAR || — || align=right | 2.5 km || 
|-id=716 bgcolor=#E9E9E9
| 59716 ||  || — || May 13, 1999 || Socorro || LINEAR || MAR || align=right | 3.9 km || 
|-id=717 bgcolor=#E9E9E9
| 59717 ||  || — || May 10, 1999 || Puckett || Puckett Obs. || GEF || align=right | 2.3 km || 
|-id=718 bgcolor=#E9E9E9
| 59718 ||  || — || May 18, 1999 || Socorro || LINEAR || — || align=right | 8.3 km || 
|-id=719 bgcolor=#E9E9E9
| 59719 ||  || — || May 17, 1999 || Kitt Peak || Spacewatch || — || align=right | 2.8 km || 
|-id=720 bgcolor=#E9E9E9
| 59720 ||  || — || May 20, 1999 || Kitt Peak || Spacewatch || — || align=right | 1.6 km || 
|-id=721 bgcolor=#fefefe
| 59721 ||  || — || May 21, 1999 || Kitt Peak || Spacewatch || — || align=right | 4.2 km || 
|-id=722 bgcolor=#E9E9E9
| 59722 ||  || — || May 17, 1999 || Socorro || LINEAR || — || align=right | 3.7 km || 
|-id=723 bgcolor=#E9E9E9
| 59723 ||  || — || May 18, 1999 || Socorro || LINEAR || GER || align=right | 4.1 km || 
|-id=724 bgcolor=#E9E9E9
| 59724 ||  || — || May 18, 1999 || Socorro || LINEAR || — || align=right | 5.9 km || 
|-id=725 bgcolor=#E9E9E9
| 59725 ||  || — || May 18, 1999 || Socorro || LINEAR || — || align=right | 3.5 km || 
|-id=726 bgcolor=#E9E9E9
| 59726 ||  || — || May 18, 1999 || Socorro || LINEAR || — || align=right | 4.5 km || 
|-id=727 bgcolor=#E9E9E9
| 59727 ||  || — || May 18, 1999 || Socorro || LINEAR || — || align=right | 3.5 km || 
|-id=728 bgcolor=#E9E9E9
| 59728 ||  || — || May 18, 1999 || Socorro || LINEAR || — || align=right | 2.9 km || 
|-id=729 bgcolor=#E9E9E9
| 59729 || 1999 LN || — || June 6, 1999 || Višnjan Observatory || K. Korlević || — || align=right | 6.3 km || 
|-id=730 bgcolor=#fefefe
| 59730 || 1999 LW || — || June 7, 1999 || Prescott || P. G. Comba || — || align=right | 2.1 km || 
|-id=731 bgcolor=#E9E9E9
| 59731 ||  || — || June 8, 1999 || Socorro || LINEAR || ADE || align=right | 4.3 km || 
|-id=732 bgcolor=#E9E9E9
| 59732 ||  || — || June 8, 1999 || Socorro || LINEAR || EUN || align=right | 3.0 km || 
|-id=733 bgcolor=#E9E9E9
| 59733 ||  || — || June 8, 1999 || Socorro || LINEAR || — || align=right | 3.2 km || 
|-id=734 bgcolor=#fefefe
| 59734 ||  || — || June 9, 1999 || Socorro || LINEAR || ERI || align=right | 4.1 km || 
|-id=735 bgcolor=#E9E9E9
| 59735 ||  || — || June 9, 1999 || Socorro || LINEAR || — || align=right | 6.1 km || 
|-id=736 bgcolor=#E9E9E9
| 59736 ||  || — || June 8, 1999 || Socorro || LINEAR || — || align=right | 6.0 km || 
|-id=737 bgcolor=#E9E9E9
| 59737 ||  || — || June 11, 1999 || Socorro || LINEAR || BAR || align=right | 4.8 km || 
|-id=738 bgcolor=#E9E9E9
| 59738 ||  || — || June 8, 1999 || Socorro || LINEAR || — || align=right | 4.8 km || 
|-id=739 bgcolor=#E9E9E9
| 59739 ||  || — || June 8, 1999 || Socorro || LINEAR || MAR || align=right | 2.9 km || 
|-id=740 bgcolor=#E9E9E9
| 59740 ||  || — || June 8, 1999 || Socorro || LINEAR || GEF || align=right | 3.4 km || 
|-id=741 bgcolor=#E9E9E9
| 59741 ||  || — || June 8, 1999 || Socorro || LINEAR || — || align=right | 2.9 km || 
|-id=742 bgcolor=#E9E9E9
| 59742 ||  || — || June 8, 1999 || Socorro || LINEAR || — || align=right | 6.6 km || 
|-id=743 bgcolor=#E9E9E9
| 59743 ||  || — || June 8, 1999 || Socorro || LINEAR || ADE || align=right | 5.5 km || 
|-id=744 bgcolor=#fefefe
| 59744 ||  || — || June 8, 1999 || Socorro || LINEAR || — || align=right | 4.5 km || 
|-id=745 bgcolor=#E9E9E9
| 59745 ||  || — || June 9, 1999 || Socorro || LINEAR || EUN || align=right | 3.7 km || 
|-id=746 bgcolor=#E9E9E9
| 59746 ||  || — || June 9, 1999 || Socorro || LINEAR || — || align=right | 3.9 km || 
|-id=747 bgcolor=#E9E9E9
| 59747 ||  || — || June 9, 1999 || Socorro || LINEAR || — || align=right | 3.6 km || 
|-id=748 bgcolor=#E9E9E9
| 59748 ||  || — || June 9, 1999 || Socorro || LINEAR || MAR || align=right | 5.6 km || 
|-id=749 bgcolor=#fefefe
| 59749 ||  || — || June 12, 1999 || Socorro || LINEAR || H || align=right | 1.3 km || 
|-id=750 bgcolor=#E9E9E9
| 59750 ||  || — || June 9, 1999 || Socorro || LINEAR || — || align=right | 2.5 km || 
|-id=751 bgcolor=#E9E9E9
| 59751 ||  || — || June 9, 1999 || Socorro || LINEAR || — || align=right | 3.4 km || 
|-id=752 bgcolor=#E9E9E9
| 59752 ||  || — || June 9, 1999 || Socorro || LINEAR || — || align=right | 5.2 km || 
|-id=753 bgcolor=#fefefe
| 59753 ||  || — || June 10, 1999 || Socorro || LINEAR || — || align=right | 1.8 km || 
|-id=754 bgcolor=#fefefe
| 59754 ||  || — || June 11, 1999 || Kitt Peak || Spacewatch || — || align=right | 1.8 km || 
|-id=755 bgcolor=#E9E9E9
| 59755 ||  || — || June 8, 1999 || Socorro || LINEAR || EUN || align=right | 4.0 km || 
|-id=756 bgcolor=#E9E9E9
| 59756 ||  || — || June 7, 1999 || Catalina || CSS || HNS || align=right | 3.7 km || 
|-id=757 bgcolor=#E9E9E9
| 59757 || 1999 ME || — || June 18, 1999 || Reedy Creek || J. Broughton || — || align=right | 5.5 km || 
|-id=758 bgcolor=#fefefe
| 59758 || 1999 MH || — || June 18, 1999 || Woomera || F. B. Zoltowski || — || align=right | 2.2 km || 
|-id=759 bgcolor=#E9E9E9
| 59759 || 1999 MR || — || June 20, 1999 || Reedy Creek || J. Broughton || — || align=right | 4.5 km || 
|-id=760 bgcolor=#E9E9E9
| 59760 || 1999 MU || — || June 22, 1999 || Catalina || CSS || EUN || align=right | 2.9 km || 
|-id=761 bgcolor=#fefefe
| 59761 || 1999 MZ || — || June 23, 1999 || Woomera || F. B. Zoltowski || V || align=right | 1.8 km || 
|-id=762 bgcolor=#fefefe
| 59762 ||  || — || July 11, 1999 || Višnjan Observatory || K. Korlević || V || align=right | 1.8 km || 
|-id=763 bgcolor=#d6d6d6
| 59763 ||  || — || July 12, 1999 || Socorro || LINEAR || URS || align=right | 9.8 km || 
|-id=764 bgcolor=#E9E9E9
| 59764 ||  || — || July 13, 1999 || Socorro || LINEAR || — || align=right | 5.2 km || 
|-id=765 bgcolor=#E9E9E9
| 59765 ||  || — || July 13, 1999 || Reedy Creek || J. Broughton || PAE || align=right | 6.9 km || 
|-id=766 bgcolor=#E9E9E9
| 59766 ||  || — || July 13, 1999 || Socorro || LINEAR || — || align=right | 4.9 km || 
|-id=767 bgcolor=#d6d6d6
| 59767 ||  || — || July 13, 1999 || Socorro || LINEAR || EOS || align=right | 9.0 km || 
|-id=768 bgcolor=#d6d6d6
| 59768 ||  || — || July 13, 1999 || Socorro || LINEAR || EOS || align=right | 5.6 km || 
|-id=769 bgcolor=#fefefe
| 59769 ||  || — || July 14, 1999 || Socorro || LINEAR || NYS || align=right | 3.8 km || 
|-id=770 bgcolor=#E9E9E9
| 59770 ||  || — || July 14, 1999 || Socorro || LINEAR || GEF || align=right | 3.5 km || 
|-id=771 bgcolor=#E9E9E9
| 59771 ||  || — || July 14, 1999 || Socorro || LINEAR || — || align=right | 6.1 km || 
|-id=772 bgcolor=#E9E9E9
| 59772 ||  || — || July 14, 1999 || Socorro || LINEAR || — || align=right | 4.6 km || 
|-id=773 bgcolor=#d6d6d6
| 59773 ||  || — || July 14, 1999 || Socorro || LINEAR || — || align=right | 5.9 km || 
|-id=774 bgcolor=#fefefe
| 59774 ||  || — || July 14, 1999 || Socorro || LINEAR || MAS || align=right | 1.5 km || 
|-id=775 bgcolor=#E9E9E9
| 59775 ||  || — || July 14, 1999 || Socorro || LINEAR || DOR || align=right | 6.1 km || 
|-id=776 bgcolor=#E9E9E9
| 59776 ||  || — || July 14, 1999 || Socorro || LINEAR || ADE || align=right | 6.2 km || 
|-id=777 bgcolor=#fefefe
| 59777 ||  || — || July 14, 1999 || Socorro || LINEAR || — || align=right | 2.0 km || 
|-id=778 bgcolor=#E9E9E9
| 59778 ||  || — || July 14, 1999 || Socorro || LINEAR || — || align=right | 3.0 km || 
|-id=779 bgcolor=#d6d6d6
| 59779 ||  || — || July 14, 1999 || Socorro || LINEAR || HYG || align=right | 8.9 km || 
|-id=780 bgcolor=#d6d6d6
| 59780 ||  || — || July 14, 1999 || Socorro || LINEAR || EOS || align=right | 5.9 km || 
|-id=781 bgcolor=#d6d6d6
| 59781 ||  || — || July 14, 1999 || Socorro || LINEAR || URS || align=right | 8.9 km || 
|-id=782 bgcolor=#E9E9E9
| 59782 ||  || — || July 13, 1999 || Socorro || LINEAR || EUN || align=right | 3.3 km || 
|-id=783 bgcolor=#fefefe
| 59783 ||  || — || July 13, 1999 || Socorro || LINEAR || FLO || align=right | 2.5 km || 
|-id=784 bgcolor=#E9E9E9
| 59784 ||  || — || July 13, 1999 || Socorro || LINEAR || EUN || align=right | 3.1 km || 
|-id=785 bgcolor=#fefefe
| 59785 ||  || — || July 13, 1999 || Socorro || LINEAR || FLO || align=right | 2.0 km || 
|-id=786 bgcolor=#d6d6d6
| 59786 ||  || — || July 12, 1999 || Socorro || LINEAR || BRA || align=right | 3.3 km || 
|-id=787 bgcolor=#E9E9E9
| 59787 ||  || — || July 12, 1999 || Socorro || LINEAR || INO || align=right | 4.5 km || 
|-id=788 bgcolor=#d6d6d6
| 59788 ||  || — || July 12, 1999 || Socorro || LINEAR || AEG || align=right | 9.9 km || 
|-id=789 bgcolor=#E9E9E9
| 59789 ||  || — || July 12, 1999 || Socorro || LINEAR || — || align=right | 4.5 km || 
|-id=790 bgcolor=#d6d6d6
| 59790 ||  || — || July 12, 1999 || Socorro || LINEAR || — || align=right | 9.5 km || 
|-id=791 bgcolor=#E9E9E9
| 59791 ||  || — || July 13, 1999 || Socorro || LINEAR || CLO || align=right | 5.3 km || 
|-id=792 bgcolor=#E9E9E9
| 59792 ||  || — || July 13, 1999 || Socorro || LINEAR || — || align=right | 6.1 km || 
|-id=793 bgcolor=#d6d6d6
| 59793 Clapiès || 1999 OD ||  || July 16, 1999 || Pises || Pises Obs. || — || align=right | 5.3 km || 
|-id=794 bgcolor=#E9E9E9
| 59794 ||  || — || July 18, 1999 || Reedy Creek || J. Broughton || — || align=right | 3.3 km || 
|-id=795 bgcolor=#d6d6d6
| 59795 ||  || — || July 22, 1999 || Socorro || LINEAR || URS || align=right | 12 km || 
|-id=796 bgcolor=#E9E9E9
| 59796 ||  || — || July 22, 1999 || Socorro || LINEAR || — || align=right | 5.7 km || 
|-id=797 bgcolor=#fefefe
| 59797 Píšala || 1999 PX ||  || August 7, 1999 || Kleť || J. Tichá, M. Tichý || — || align=right | 1.6 km || 
|-id=798 bgcolor=#d6d6d6
| 59798 ||  || — || August 3, 1999 || Siding Spring || R. H. McNaught || — || align=right | 8.3 km || 
|-id=799 bgcolor=#fefefe
| 59799 ||  || — || August 10, 1999 || Reedy Creek || J. Broughton || — || align=right | 1.7 km || 
|-id=800 bgcolor=#E9E9E9
| 59800 Astropis ||  ||  || August 14, 1999 || Ondřejov || P. Pravec, P. Kušnirák || HNS || align=right | 3.9 km || 
|}

59801–59900 

|-bgcolor=#E9E9E9
| 59801 ||  || — || August 8, 1999 || Gekko || T. Kagawa || — || align=right | 3.5 km || 
|-id=802 bgcolor=#d6d6d6
| 59802 ||  || — || August 13, 1999 || Kitt Peak || Spacewatch || VER || align=right | 5.4 km || 
|-id=803 bgcolor=#d6d6d6
| 59803 ||  || — || August 22, 1999 || Farpoint || G. Bell || — || align=right | 5.0 km || 
|-id=804 bgcolor=#d6d6d6
| 59804 Dickjoyce ||  ||  || September 5, 1999 || Fountain Hills || C. W. Juels || — || align=right | 14 km || 
|-id=805 bgcolor=#d6d6d6
| 59805 ||  || — || September 3, 1999 || Kitt Peak || Spacewatch || — || align=right | 7.0 km || 
|-id=806 bgcolor=#d6d6d6
| 59806 ||  || — || September 7, 1999 || Socorro || LINEAR || — || align=right | 4.9 km || 
|-id=807 bgcolor=#d6d6d6
| 59807 ||  || — || September 7, 1999 || Socorro || LINEAR || KOR || align=right | 3.4 km || 
|-id=808 bgcolor=#d6d6d6
| 59808 ||  || — || September 7, 1999 || Socorro || LINEAR || — || align=right | 6.6 km || 
|-id=809 bgcolor=#d6d6d6
| 59809 ||  || — || September 7, 1999 || Socorro || LINEAR || HYG || align=right | 5.3 km || 
|-id=810 bgcolor=#d6d6d6
| 59810 ||  || — || September 7, 1999 || Socorro || LINEAR || HYG || align=right | 6.1 km || 
|-id=811 bgcolor=#d6d6d6
| 59811 ||  || — || September 7, 1999 || Socorro || LINEAR || — || align=right | 4.3 km || 
|-id=812 bgcolor=#d6d6d6
| 59812 ||  || — || September 7, 1999 || Socorro || LINEAR || — || align=right | 12 km || 
|-id=813 bgcolor=#fefefe
| 59813 ||  || — || September 7, 1999 || Socorro || LINEAR || — || align=right | 1.4 km || 
|-id=814 bgcolor=#fefefe
| 59814 ||  || — || September 7, 1999 || Socorro || LINEAR || NYS || align=right | 1.3 km || 
|-id=815 bgcolor=#d6d6d6
| 59815 ||  || — || September 7, 1999 || Socorro || LINEAR || — || align=right | 9.8 km || 
|-id=816 bgcolor=#fefefe
| 59816 ||  || — || September 7, 1999 || Socorro || LINEAR || V || align=right | 1.6 km || 
|-id=817 bgcolor=#d6d6d6
| 59817 ||  || — || September 7, 1999 || Socorro || LINEAR || — || align=right | 5.4 km || 
|-id=818 bgcolor=#d6d6d6
| 59818 ||  || — || September 7, 1999 || Socorro || LINEAR || — || align=right | 5.1 km || 
|-id=819 bgcolor=#d6d6d6
| 59819 ||  || — || September 7, 1999 || Socorro || LINEAR || — || align=right | 5.6 km || 
|-id=820 bgcolor=#E9E9E9
| 59820 ||  || — || September 7, 1999 || Socorro || LINEAR || — || align=right | 5.1 km || 
|-id=821 bgcolor=#fefefe
| 59821 ||  || — || September 7, 1999 || Socorro || LINEAR || — || align=right | 1.9 km || 
|-id=822 bgcolor=#d6d6d6
| 59822 ||  || — || September 7, 1999 || Socorro || LINEAR || — || align=right | 10 km || 
|-id=823 bgcolor=#d6d6d6
| 59823 ||  || — || September 7, 1999 || Socorro || LINEAR || — || align=right | 3.8 km || 
|-id=824 bgcolor=#d6d6d6
| 59824 ||  || — || September 7, 1999 || Višnjan Observatory || K. Korlević || — || align=right | 8.5 km || 
|-id=825 bgcolor=#d6d6d6
| 59825 ||  || — || September 8, 1999 || Višnjan Observatory || K. Korlević || — || align=right | 9.9 km || 
|-id=826 bgcolor=#fefefe
| 59826 ||  || — || September 8, 1999 || Socorro || LINEAR || H || align=right | 1.2 km || 
|-id=827 bgcolor=#E9E9E9
| 59827 ||  || — || September 9, 1999 || Višnjan Observatory || K. Korlević || — || align=right | 3.2 km || 
|-id=828 bgcolor=#E9E9E9
| 59828 Ossikar ||  ||  || September 5, 1999 || Drebach || G. Lehmann || AGN || align=right | 2.7 km || 
|-id=829 bgcolor=#d6d6d6
| 59829 ||  || — || September 7, 1999 || Farpoint || G. Bell, G. Hug || — || align=right | 7.0 km || 
|-id=830 bgcolor=#d6d6d6
| 59830 Reynek ||  ||  || September 10, 1999 || Kleť || J. Tichá, M. Tichý || — || align=right | 4.8 km || 
|-id=831 bgcolor=#d6d6d6
| 59831 ||  || — || September 11, 1999 || Višnjan Observatory || K. Korlević || — || align=right | 7.5 km || 
|-id=832 bgcolor=#fefefe
| 59832 ||  || — || September 13, 1999 || Prescott || P. G. Comba || — || align=right | 1.4 km || 
|-id=833 bgcolor=#d6d6d6
| 59833 Danimatter ||  ||  || September 3, 1999 || Village-Neuf || C. Demeautis || — || align=right | 6.2 km || 
|-id=834 bgcolor=#fefefe
| 59834 ||  || — || September 9, 1999 || Uto || F. Uto || — || align=right | 1.6 km || 
|-id=835 bgcolor=#d6d6d6
| 59835 ||  || — || September 13, 1999 || Ondřejov || P. Pravec, P. Kušnirák || EOS || align=right | 5.1 km || 
|-id=836 bgcolor=#FA8072
| 59836 ||  || — || September 8, 1999 || Socorro || LINEAR || — || align=right | 2.0 km || 
|-id=837 bgcolor=#d6d6d6
| 59837 ||  || — || September 3, 1999 || Teide || R. Casas, C. Zurita || EOS || align=right | 5.0 km || 
|-id=838 bgcolor=#E9E9E9
| 59838 ||  || — || September 9, 1999 || Uccle || T. Pauwels || — || align=right | 3.7 km || 
|-id=839 bgcolor=#fefefe
| 59839 ||  || — || September 7, 1999 || Socorro || LINEAR || — || align=right | 2.5 km || 
|-id=840 bgcolor=#d6d6d6
| 59840 ||  || — || September 7, 1999 || Socorro || LINEAR || EOS || align=right | 9.3 km || 
|-id=841 bgcolor=#fefefe
| 59841 ||  || — || September 7, 1999 || Socorro || LINEAR || NYS || align=right | 1.7 km || 
|-id=842 bgcolor=#E9E9E9
| 59842 ||  || — || September 7, 1999 || Socorro || LINEAR || — || align=right | 3.2 km || 
|-id=843 bgcolor=#d6d6d6
| 59843 ||  || — || September 7, 1999 || Socorro || LINEAR || — || align=right | 6.6 km || 
|-id=844 bgcolor=#d6d6d6
| 59844 ||  || — || September 7, 1999 || Socorro || LINEAR || EOS || align=right | 4.1 km || 
|-id=845 bgcolor=#d6d6d6
| 59845 ||  || — || September 7, 1999 || Socorro || LINEAR || EOS || align=right | 5.0 km || 
|-id=846 bgcolor=#d6d6d6
| 59846 ||  || — || September 7, 1999 || Socorro || LINEAR || KOR || align=right | 3.4 km || 
|-id=847 bgcolor=#d6d6d6
| 59847 ||  || — || September 7, 1999 || Socorro || LINEAR || THM || align=right | 6.7 km || 
|-id=848 bgcolor=#E9E9E9
| 59848 ||  || — || September 7, 1999 || Socorro || LINEAR || — || align=right | 3.7 km || 
|-id=849 bgcolor=#E9E9E9
| 59849 ||  || — || September 7, 1999 || Socorro || LINEAR || — || align=right | 2.4 km || 
|-id=850 bgcolor=#fefefe
| 59850 ||  || — || September 7, 1999 || Socorro || LINEAR || — || align=right | 1.5 km || 
|-id=851 bgcolor=#d6d6d6
| 59851 ||  || — || September 7, 1999 || Socorro || LINEAR || — || align=right | 7.3 km || 
|-id=852 bgcolor=#d6d6d6
| 59852 ||  || — || September 7, 1999 || Socorro || LINEAR || — || align=right | 8.4 km || 
|-id=853 bgcolor=#d6d6d6
| 59853 ||  || — || September 7, 1999 || Socorro || LINEAR || — || align=right | 3.2 km || 
|-id=854 bgcolor=#d6d6d6
| 59854 ||  || — || September 7, 1999 || Socorro || LINEAR || HYG || align=right | 8.4 km || 
|-id=855 bgcolor=#E9E9E9
| 59855 ||  || — || September 7, 1999 || Socorro || LINEAR || — || align=right | 6.1 km || 
|-id=856 bgcolor=#fefefe
| 59856 ||  || — || September 7, 1999 || Socorro || LINEAR || — || align=right | 1.6 km || 
|-id=857 bgcolor=#d6d6d6
| 59857 ||  || — || September 7, 1999 || Socorro || LINEAR || — || align=right | 8.6 km || 
|-id=858 bgcolor=#d6d6d6
| 59858 ||  || — || September 7, 1999 || Socorro || LINEAR || — || align=right | 6.6 km || 
|-id=859 bgcolor=#E9E9E9
| 59859 ||  || — || September 7, 1999 || Socorro || LINEAR || — || align=right | 3.4 km || 
|-id=860 bgcolor=#d6d6d6
| 59860 ||  || — || September 7, 1999 || Socorro || LINEAR || THM || align=right | 6.4 km || 
|-id=861 bgcolor=#d6d6d6
| 59861 ||  || — || September 7, 1999 || Socorro || LINEAR || — || align=right | 7.4 km || 
|-id=862 bgcolor=#d6d6d6
| 59862 ||  || — || September 7, 1999 || Socorro || LINEAR || THM || align=right | 5.9 km || 
|-id=863 bgcolor=#d6d6d6
| 59863 ||  || — || September 7, 1999 || Socorro || LINEAR || THM || align=right | 7.3 km || 
|-id=864 bgcolor=#d6d6d6
| 59864 ||  || — || September 8, 1999 || Socorro || LINEAR || — || align=right | 9.4 km || 
|-id=865 bgcolor=#d6d6d6
| 59865 ||  || — || September 8, 1999 || Socorro || LINEAR || EOS || align=right | 4.7 km || 
|-id=866 bgcolor=#d6d6d6
| 59866 ||  || — || September 8, 1999 || Socorro || LINEAR || EOS || align=right | 5.9 km || 
|-id=867 bgcolor=#d6d6d6
| 59867 ||  || — || September 8, 1999 || Socorro || LINEAR || — || align=right | 11 km || 
|-id=868 bgcolor=#E9E9E9
| 59868 ||  || — || September 8, 1999 || Socorro || LINEAR || — || align=right | 2.9 km || 
|-id=869 bgcolor=#d6d6d6
| 59869 ||  || — || September 8, 1999 || Socorro || LINEAR || EOS || align=right | 5.4 km || 
|-id=870 bgcolor=#d6d6d6
| 59870 ||  || — || September 8, 1999 || Socorro || LINEAR || EOS || align=right | 5.3 km || 
|-id=871 bgcolor=#d6d6d6
| 59871 ||  || — || September 9, 1999 || Socorro || LINEAR || EOS || align=right | 5.5 km || 
|-id=872 bgcolor=#E9E9E9
| 59872 ||  || — || September 9, 1999 || Socorro || LINEAR || GEF || align=right | 2.8 km || 
|-id=873 bgcolor=#fefefe
| 59873 ||  || — || September 9, 1999 || Socorro || LINEAR || — || align=right | 2.1 km || 
|-id=874 bgcolor=#E9E9E9
| 59874 ||  || — || September 9, 1999 || Socorro || LINEAR || — || align=right | 5.9 km || 
|-id=875 bgcolor=#d6d6d6
| 59875 ||  || — || September 9, 1999 || Socorro || LINEAR || THM || align=right | 5.8 km || 
|-id=876 bgcolor=#d6d6d6
| 59876 ||  || — || September 9, 1999 || Socorro || LINEAR || — || align=right | 4.5 km || 
|-id=877 bgcolor=#E9E9E9
| 59877 ||  || — || September 9, 1999 || Socorro || LINEAR || EUN || align=right | 3.7 km || 
|-id=878 bgcolor=#fefefe
| 59878 ||  || — || September 9, 1999 || Socorro || LINEAR || V || align=right | 2.0 km || 
|-id=879 bgcolor=#d6d6d6
| 59879 ||  || — || September 9, 1999 || Socorro || LINEAR || EOSfast? || align=right | 6.4 km || 
|-id=880 bgcolor=#d6d6d6
| 59880 ||  || — || September 9, 1999 || Socorro || LINEAR || — || align=right | 6.1 km || 
|-id=881 bgcolor=#d6d6d6
| 59881 ||  || — || September 9, 1999 || Socorro || LINEAR || fast || align=right | 7.7 km || 
|-id=882 bgcolor=#d6d6d6
| 59882 ||  || — || September 9, 1999 || Socorro || LINEAR || — || align=right | 7.5 km || 
|-id=883 bgcolor=#E9E9E9
| 59883 ||  || — || September 9, 1999 || Socorro || LINEAR || DOR || align=right | 7.2 km || 
|-id=884 bgcolor=#E9E9E9
| 59884 ||  || — || September 9, 1999 || Socorro || LINEAR || AST || align=right | 6.7 km || 
|-id=885 bgcolor=#E9E9E9
| 59885 ||  || — || September 9, 1999 || Socorro || LINEAR || — || align=right | 5.0 km || 
|-id=886 bgcolor=#fefefe
| 59886 ||  || — || September 9, 1999 || Socorro || LINEAR || — || align=right | 2.4 km || 
|-id=887 bgcolor=#d6d6d6
| 59887 ||  || — || September 9, 1999 || Socorro || LINEAR || — || align=right | 8.7 km || 
|-id=888 bgcolor=#d6d6d6
| 59888 ||  || — || September 9, 1999 || Socorro || LINEAR || 7:4 || align=right | 13 km || 
|-id=889 bgcolor=#d6d6d6
| 59889 ||  || — || September 9, 1999 || Socorro || LINEAR || — || align=right | 6.0 km || 
|-id=890 bgcolor=#d6d6d6
| 59890 ||  || — || September 9, 1999 || Socorro || LINEAR || — || align=right | 8.7 km || 
|-id=891 bgcolor=#d6d6d6
| 59891 ||  || — || September 9, 1999 || Socorro || LINEAR || — || align=right | 8.8 km || 
|-id=892 bgcolor=#d6d6d6
| 59892 ||  || — || September 9, 1999 || Socorro || LINEAR || 628 || align=right | 4.6 km || 
|-id=893 bgcolor=#fefefe
| 59893 ||  || — || September 9, 1999 || Socorro || LINEAR || — || align=right | 2.4 km || 
|-id=894 bgcolor=#d6d6d6
| 59894 ||  || — || September 9, 1999 || Socorro || LINEAR || — || align=right | 7.7 km || 
|-id=895 bgcolor=#d6d6d6
| 59895 ||  || — || September 9, 1999 || Socorro || LINEAR || HYG || align=right | 6.4 km || 
|-id=896 bgcolor=#d6d6d6
| 59896 ||  || — || September 9, 1999 || Socorro || LINEAR || THM || align=right | 5.6 km || 
|-id=897 bgcolor=#d6d6d6
| 59897 ||  || — || September 9, 1999 || Socorro || LINEAR || — || align=right | 3.7 km || 
|-id=898 bgcolor=#fefefe
| 59898 ||  || — || September 9, 1999 || Socorro || LINEAR || NYS || align=right | 1.1 km || 
|-id=899 bgcolor=#d6d6d6
| 59899 ||  || — || September 9, 1999 || Socorro || LINEAR || CHA || align=right | 5.7 km || 
|-id=900 bgcolor=#d6d6d6
| 59900 ||  || — || September 9, 1999 || Socorro || LINEAR || CRO || align=right | 9.3 km || 
|}

59901–60000 

|-bgcolor=#E9E9E9
| 59901 ||  || — || September 9, 1999 || Socorro || LINEAR || — || align=right | 3.3 km || 
|-id=902 bgcolor=#d6d6d6
| 59902 ||  || — || September 9, 1999 || Socorro || LINEAR || — || align=right | 10 km || 
|-id=903 bgcolor=#d6d6d6
| 59903 ||  || — || September 9, 1999 || Socorro || LINEAR || 7:4 || align=right | 13 km || 
|-id=904 bgcolor=#d6d6d6
| 59904 ||  || — || September 9, 1999 || Socorro || LINEAR || — || align=right | 8.8 km || 
|-id=905 bgcolor=#d6d6d6
| 59905 ||  || — || September 9, 1999 || Socorro || LINEAR || — || align=right | 10 km || 
|-id=906 bgcolor=#fefefe
| 59906 ||  || — || September 9, 1999 || Socorro || LINEAR || NYS || align=right | 1.4 km || 
|-id=907 bgcolor=#d6d6d6
| 59907 ||  || — || September 9, 1999 || Socorro || LINEAR || — || align=right | 6.5 km || 
|-id=908 bgcolor=#d6d6d6
| 59908 ||  || — || September 9, 1999 || Socorro || LINEAR || — || align=right | 11 km || 
|-id=909 bgcolor=#d6d6d6
| 59909 ||  || — || September 9, 1999 || Socorro || LINEAR || EOS || align=right | 8.9 km || 
|-id=910 bgcolor=#fefefe
| 59910 ||  || — || September 9, 1999 || Socorro || LINEAR || FLO || align=right | 2.1 km || 
|-id=911 bgcolor=#d6d6d6
| 59911 ||  || — || September 9, 1999 || Socorro || LINEAR || HYG || align=right | 6.5 km || 
|-id=912 bgcolor=#d6d6d6
| 59912 ||  || — || September 9, 1999 || Socorro || LINEAR || HYG || align=right | 6.6 km || 
|-id=913 bgcolor=#d6d6d6
| 59913 ||  || — || September 9, 1999 || Socorro || LINEAR || EOS || align=right | 3.8 km || 
|-id=914 bgcolor=#d6d6d6
| 59914 ||  || — || September 9, 1999 || Socorro || LINEAR || — || align=right | 7.7 km || 
|-id=915 bgcolor=#d6d6d6
| 59915 ||  || — || September 9, 1999 || Socorro || LINEAR || — || align=right | 18 km || 
|-id=916 bgcolor=#d6d6d6
| 59916 ||  || — || September 9, 1999 || Socorro || LINEAR || — || align=right | 3.9 km || 
|-id=917 bgcolor=#d6d6d6
| 59917 ||  || — || September 9, 1999 || Socorro || LINEAR || HYG || align=right | 6.4 km || 
|-id=918 bgcolor=#fefefe
| 59918 ||  || — || September 9, 1999 || Socorro || LINEAR || — || align=right | 2.9 km || 
|-id=919 bgcolor=#d6d6d6
| 59919 ||  || — || September 9, 1999 || Socorro || LINEAR || — || align=right | 7.4 km || 
|-id=920 bgcolor=#E9E9E9
| 59920 ||  || — || September 9, 1999 || Socorro || LINEAR || GEF || align=right | 5.1 km || 
|-id=921 bgcolor=#d6d6d6
| 59921 ||  || — || September 9, 1999 || Socorro || LINEAR || — || align=right | 5.4 km || 
|-id=922 bgcolor=#E9E9E9
| 59922 ||  || — || September 9, 1999 || Socorro || LINEAR || — || align=right | 5.1 km || 
|-id=923 bgcolor=#E9E9E9
| 59923 ||  || — || September 9, 1999 || Socorro || LINEAR || HNA || align=right | 5.6 km || 
|-id=924 bgcolor=#d6d6d6
| 59924 ||  || — || September 9, 1999 || Socorro || LINEAR || — || align=right | 6.9 km || 
|-id=925 bgcolor=#d6d6d6
| 59925 ||  || — || September 9, 1999 || Socorro || LINEAR || — || align=right | 4.4 km || 
|-id=926 bgcolor=#d6d6d6
| 59926 ||  || — || September 9, 1999 || Socorro || LINEAR || URS || align=right | 8.2 km || 
|-id=927 bgcolor=#d6d6d6
| 59927 ||  || — || September 9, 1999 || Socorro || LINEAR || — || align=right | 10 km || 
|-id=928 bgcolor=#d6d6d6
| 59928 ||  || — || September 9, 1999 || Socorro || LINEAR || — || align=right | 6.3 km || 
|-id=929 bgcolor=#d6d6d6
| 59929 ||  || — || September 9, 1999 || Socorro || LINEAR || — || align=right | 4.5 km || 
|-id=930 bgcolor=#d6d6d6
| 59930 ||  || — || September 9, 1999 || Socorro || LINEAR || — || align=right | 7.0 km || 
|-id=931 bgcolor=#d6d6d6
| 59931 ||  || — || September 9, 1999 || Socorro || LINEAR || EOS || align=right | 6.7 km || 
|-id=932 bgcolor=#fefefe
| 59932 ||  || — || September 9, 1999 || Socorro || LINEAR || NYS || align=right | 1.2 km || 
|-id=933 bgcolor=#d6d6d6
| 59933 ||  || — || September 9, 1999 || Socorro || LINEAR || — || align=right | 3.8 km || 
|-id=934 bgcolor=#d6d6d6
| 59934 ||  || — || September 9, 1999 || Socorro || LINEAR || — || align=right | 3.4 km || 
|-id=935 bgcolor=#d6d6d6
| 59935 ||  || — || September 9, 1999 || Socorro || LINEAR || KOR || align=right | 3.7 km || 
|-id=936 bgcolor=#d6d6d6
| 59936 ||  || — || September 9, 1999 || Socorro || LINEAR || — || align=right | 4.0 km || 
|-id=937 bgcolor=#d6d6d6
| 59937 ||  || — || September 9, 1999 || Socorro || LINEAR || EOS || align=right | 4.0 km || 
|-id=938 bgcolor=#d6d6d6
| 59938 ||  || — || September 10, 1999 || Socorro || LINEAR || — || align=right | 4.3 km || 
|-id=939 bgcolor=#d6d6d6
| 59939 ||  || — || September 13, 1999 || Socorro || LINEAR || MEL || align=right | 7.1 km || 
|-id=940 bgcolor=#fefefe
| 59940 ||  || — || September 8, 1999 || Socorro || LINEAR || V || align=right | 1.4 km || 
|-id=941 bgcolor=#d6d6d6
| 59941 ||  || — || September 8, 1999 || Socorro || LINEAR || VER || align=right | 11 km || 
|-id=942 bgcolor=#d6d6d6
| 59942 ||  || — || September 8, 1999 || Socorro || LINEAR || EOS || align=right | 6.9 km || 
|-id=943 bgcolor=#d6d6d6
| 59943 ||  || — || September 9, 1999 || Socorro || LINEAR || — || align=right | 4.0 km || 
|-id=944 bgcolor=#d6d6d6
| 59944 ||  || — || September 8, 1999 || Socorro || LINEAR || EOS || align=right | 5.6 km || 
|-id=945 bgcolor=#d6d6d6
| 59945 ||  || — || September 8, 1999 || Socorro || LINEAR || — || align=right | 9.4 km || 
|-id=946 bgcolor=#d6d6d6
| 59946 ||  || — || September 8, 1999 || Socorro || LINEAR || — || align=right | 9.3 km || 
|-id=947 bgcolor=#d6d6d6
| 59947 ||  || — || September 8, 1999 || Socorro || LINEAR || EOS || align=right | 5.0 km || 
|-id=948 bgcolor=#d6d6d6
| 59948 ||  || — || September 13, 1999 || Kitt Peak || Spacewatch || EOS || align=right | 4.2 km || 
|-id=949 bgcolor=#fefefe
| 59949 ||  || — || September 3, 1999 || Anderson Mesa || LONEOS || NYS || align=right | 1.8 km || 
|-id=950 bgcolor=#d6d6d6
| 59950 ||  || — || September 4, 1999 || Anderson Mesa || LONEOS || — || align=right | 9.0 km || 
|-id=951 bgcolor=#fefefe
| 59951 ||  || — || September 5, 1999 || Anderson Mesa || LONEOS || FLO || align=right | 1.4 km || 
|-id=952 bgcolor=#d6d6d6
| 59952 ||  || — || September 7, 1999 || Anderson Mesa || LONEOS || — || align=right | 2.9 km || 
|-id=953 bgcolor=#d6d6d6
| 59953 ||  || — || September 4, 1999 || Catalina || CSS || — || align=right | 9.0 km || 
|-id=954 bgcolor=#d6d6d6
| 59954 ||  || — || September 5, 1999 || Catalina || CSS || — || align=right | 6.5 km || 
|-id=955 bgcolor=#d6d6d6
| 59955 ||  || — || September 5, 1999 || Catalina || CSS || EOS || align=right | 5.1 km || 
|-id=956 bgcolor=#d6d6d6
| 59956 ||  || — || September 8, 1999 || Catalina || CSS || EOS || align=right | 6.8 km || 
|-id=957 bgcolor=#E9E9E9
| 59957 ||  || — || September 8, 1999 || Catalina || CSS || — || align=right | 4.0 km || 
|-id=958 bgcolor=#d6d6d6
| 59958 ||  || — || September 8, 1999 || Catalina || CSS || EOS || align=right | 6.1 km || 
|-id=959 bgcolor=#d6d6d6
| 59959 ||  || — || September 8, 1999 || Catalina || CSS || — || align=right | 9.3 km || 
|-id=960 bgcolor=#E9E9E9
| 59960 ||  || — || September 8, 1999 || Catalina || CSS || DOR || align=right | 5.9 km || 
|-id=961 bgcolor=#d6d6d6
| 59961 ||  || — || September 8, 1999 || Catalina || CSS || — || align=right | 7.2 km || 
|-id=962 bgcolor=#d6d6d6
| 59962 ||  || — || September 8, 1999 || Catalina || CSS || — || align=right | 3.8 km || 
|-id=963 bgcolor=#d6d6d6
| 59963 ||  || — || September 8, 1999 || Catalina || CSS || — || align=right | 14 km || 
|-id=964 bgcolor=#d6d6d6
| 59964 Pierremartin ||  ||  || September 8, 1999 || Catalina || CSS || — || align=right | 8.8 km || 
|-id=965 bgcolor=#d6d6d6
| 59965 ||  || — || September 8, 1999 || Catalina || CSS || EOS || align=right | 5.0 km || 
|-id=966 bgcolor=#d6d6d6
| 59966 ||  || — || September 8, 1999 || Catalina || CSS || EOS || align=right | 4.1 km || 
|-id=967 bgcolor=#d6d6d6
| 59967 ||  || — || September 11, 1999 || Anderson Mesa || LONEOS || — || align=right | 12 km || 
|-id=968 bgcolor=#d6d6d6
| 59968 ||  || — || September 11, 1999 || Anderson Mesa || LONEOS || — || align=right | 6.3 km || 
|-id=969 bgcolor=#d6d6d6
| 59969 ||  || — || September 4, 1999 || Catalina || CSS || — || align=right | 5.7 km || 
|-id=970 bgcolor=#fefefe
| 59970 Morate ||  ||  || September 4, 1999 || Anderson Mesa || LONEOS || NYS || align=right | 3.9 km || 
|-id=971 bgcolor=#fefefe
| 59971 ||  || — || September 5, 1999 || Anderson Mesa || LONEOS || — || align=right | 2.1 km || 
|-id=972 bgcolor=#d6d6d6
| 59972 ||  || — || September 7, 1999 || Catalina || CSS || — || align=right | 5.7 km || 
|-id=973 bgcolor=#d6d6d6
| 59973 ||  || — || September 8, 1999 || Socorro || LINEAR || 7:4 || align=right | 11 km || 
|-id=974 bgcolor=#E9E9E9
| 59974 ||  || — || September 8, 1999 || Catalina || CSS || — || align=right | 5.8 km || 
|-id=975 bgcolor=#d6d6d6
| 59975 || 1999 SE || — || September 16, 1999 || Višnjan Observatory || K. Korlević || — || align=right | 4.6 km || 
|-id=976 bgcolor=#d6d6d6
| 59976 ||  || — || September 29, 1999 || Catalina || CSS || — || align=right | 7.4 km || 
|-id=977 bgcolor=#d6d6d6
| 59977 ||  || — || September 30, 1999 || Socorro || LINEAR || — || align=right | 9.6 km || 
|-id=978 bgcolor=#fefefe
| 59978 ||  || — || September 30, 1999 || Socorro || LINEAR || H || align=right | 1.4 km || 
|-id=979 bgcolor=#FA8072
| 59979 ||  || — || September 30, 1999 || Socorro || LINEAR || H || align=right | 1.7 km || 
|-id=980 bgcolor=#d6d6d6
| 59980 ||  || — || September 30, 1999 || Socorro || LINEAR || — || align=right | 8.0 km || 
|-id=981 bgcolor=#d6d6d6
| 59981 ||  || — || September 29, 1999 || Socorro || LINEAR || — || align=right | 3.4 km || 
|-id=982 bgcolor=#d6d6d6
| 59982 ||  || — || September 29, 1999 || Socorro || LINEAR || EOS || align=right | 8.0 km || 
|-id=983 bgcolor=#d6d6d6
| 59983 ||  || — || September 29, 1999 || Overberg || A. van Staden || EOS || align=right | 6.7 km || 
|-id=984 bgcolor=#d6d6d6
| 59984 ||  || — || September 30, 1999 || Catalina || CSS || — || align=right | 6.5 km || 
|-id=985 bgcolor=#d6d6d6
| 59985 ||  || — || September 30, 1999 || Catalina || CSS || URS || align=right | 7.5 km || 
|-id=986 bgcolor=#d6d6d6
| 59986 ||  || — || September 29, 1999 || Catalina || CSS || ALA || align=right | 9.4 km || 
|-id=987 bgcolor=#d6d6d6
| 59987 ||  || — || September 29, 1999 || Catalina || CSS || — || align=right | 9.2 km || 
|-id=988 bgcolor=#E9E9E9
| 59988 ||  || — || September 29, 1999 || Catalina || CSS || — || align=right | 7.6 km || 
|-id=989 bgcolor=#fefefe
| 59989 ||  || — || September 29, 1999 || Catalina || CSS || — || align=right | 1.9 km || 
|-id=990 bgcolor=#d6d6d6
| 59990 ||  || — || September 30, 1999 || Catalina || CSS || EUP || align=right | 7.3 km || 
|-id=991 bgcolor=#d6d6d6
| 59991 ||  || — || September 30, 1999 || Socorro || LINEAR || — || align=right | 8.7 km || 
|-id=992 bgcolor=#d6d6d6
| 59992 ||  || — || September 30, 1999 || Socorro || LINEAR || EOS || align=right | 5.2 km || 
|-id=993 bgcolor=#d6d6d6
| 59993 ||  || — || September 30, 1999 || Socorro || LINEAR || — || align=right | 13 km || 
|-id=994 bgcolor=#E9E9E9
| 59994 ||  || — || September 30, 1999 || Socorro || LINEAR || — || align=right | 2.1 km || 
|-id=995 bgcolor=#d6d6d6
| 59995 ||  || — || September 30, 1999 || Catalina || CSS || EOS || align=right | 4.9 km || 
|-id=996 bgcolor=#E9E9E9
| 59996 || 1999 TZ || — || October 1, 1999 || Višnjan Observatory || K. Korlević || — || align=right | 2.3 km || 
|-id=997 bgcolor=#d6d6d6
| 59997 ||  || — || October 1, 1999 || Višnjan Observatory || K. Korlević || TIR || align=right | 3.4 km || 
|-id=998 bgcolor=#d6d6d6
| 59998 ||  || — || October 2, 1999 || Fountain Hills || C. W. Juels || ALA || align=right | 17 km || 
|-id=999 bgcolor=#d6d6d6
| 59999 ||  || — || October 3, 1999 || High Point || D. K. Chesney || EOS || align=right | 8.0 km || 
|-id=000 bgcolor=#d6d6d6
| 60000 Miminko ||  ||  || October 2, 1999 || Ondřejov || L. Kotková || EOS || align=right | 5.1 km || 
|}

References

External links 
 Discovery Circumstances: Numbered Minor Planets (55001)–(60000) (IAU Minor Planet Center)

0059